This is a partial list of notable people affiliated with Wesleyan University. It includes alumni and faculty of the institution.

Administration and faculty

Academia, past and present

 Debby Applegate – former faculty, American history, 2007 Pulitzer Prize for Biography or Autobiography
 Hannah Arendt – fellow 1961–1963, Center for Advanced Studies (now the Center for the Humanities), political theorist
 Wilbur Olin Atwater (1865 Wesleyan B.S.) – first professor of chemistry; first to quantify the calorie; pioneer, utilization of respiration calorimeter
 Reginald Bartholomew – former professor of government; former U.S. Ambassador to Italy, to Spain, to Lebanon
 Edgar S. Brightman – faculty 1915–19, philosopher, promulgated the philosophy known as Boston personalism
 Nathan Brody – emeritus professor of psychology; known for his work on intelligence and personality
 Norman O. Brown – faculty 1946-196?; professor of classics; wrote "Love's Body" and Life Against Death
 Judith Butler – faculty 1984–86; philosopher and gender theorist
 Walter Guyton Cady – faculty 1902–46; professor of physics; Duddell Medal and Prize
 Erica Chenoweth – faculty 2008–12; political scientist, expert on civil resistance movements, Grawemeyer Award winner
 Joanne V. Creighton – faculty 1990–94; professor of English; interim president, Wesleyan; 17th president, Mount Holyoke College; interim president, Haverford College
 Raymond Dodge – former professor of psychology; experimental psychologist
 Henry Duckworth – faculty 1946–51; professor of physics; president, Royal Society of Canada (1971–72)
 John Price Durbin - professor of natural science; Chaplain of the Senate, president of Dickinson College
 Luigi R. Einaudi – former faculty; professor of government; acting Secretary General of the Organization of American States (2004–05)
 Max Farrand – former professor of history
 Stephen O. Garrison – founder of the Vineland Training School
 Leslie H. Gelb – faculty 1964–67, department of history; Pulitzer Prize for Explanatory Reporting; director of project that produced the Pentagon Papers
 Richard N. Goodwin – fellow 1965–67, Center for Advanced Studies; advisor, speech writer to U.S. Presidents Kennedy, Johnson, and Senator Robert F. Kennedy
 Lori Gruen – current faculty, professor of philosophy, working at the intersections of ethical theory and ethical practice
 Philip Hallie – faculty for 32 years, philosopher; developed the model of institutional cruelty
 Gustav Hedlund – mathematician, one of the founders of symbolic and topological dynamics; visiting professor of mathematics
 Masami Imai – current faculty, economist
 Karl William Kapp – faculty 1945–50; professor of economics; one of the leading 20th-century institutional economists
 Eugene Marion Klaaren – emeritus professor, historian and professor of religion
 Stanley Lebergott – emeritus professor, American-government economist and professor of economics; noted for historical unemployment statistics
 Charles Lemert – emeritus professor, social theorist and sociologist
 Clarence D. Long – former professor of economics; former member, U.S. Council of Economic Advisers, under President Dwight Eisenhower (1953–54, 1956–57)
 Andrei Markovits – professor of comparative politics and German studies (1977–83)
 David McClelland (1938 Wesleyan B.S.) – professor of psychology in the early 1950s
 David McCullough – scholar-in-residence 1982, 1983; two National Book Awards (1978, 1982); two Pulitzer Prizes for Biography or Autobiography (1993, 2002); Presidential Medal of Freedom
 Louis Mink – faculty 1952–1983; philosopher of history; responsible for what would later be called the linguistic turn in philosophy of history
 Daniel Patrick Moynihan – fellow 1964–67, Center for Advanced Studies; later U.S. Senator, New York
 Lawrence Olson – faculty 1966–1988; historian specializing in Japan; developed the Asian-studies program at Wesleyan
 Satoshi Omura – visiting faculty in the early 1970s, honorary Max Tishler Professor of Chemistry, 2005; awarded honorary Doctor of Science, 1994; 2015 recipient of the Nobel Prize in Physiology or Medicine
 Scott Plous – current faculty, professor of psychology
 Nelson W. Polsby – former faculty, political scientist; known for study of U.S. presidency and U.S. Congress
 Nathan Pusey – former faculty, department of classics; later president of Lawrence University and 24th President of Harvard University
 William North Rice (1865 Wesleyan graduate) – professor of geology
 Francisco Rodríguez – former professor of economics and Latin American studies
 Dana Royer – current faculty, professor of earth & environmental sciences
 Walter Warwick Sawyer – faculty 1958–65, professor of mathematics
 Hon. Barry R. Schaller – current faculty, teaches bioethics and public-health law, ethics and policy; associate justice, Connecticut Supreme Court
 Elmer Eric Schattschneider – faculty, 1930–60, political scientist, namesake for award for best dissertation in U. S. in field of American politics
 Carl E. Schorske – professor of history in the 1950s; Pulitzer Prize for History and MacArthur Fellowship
 Frederick Slocum – first professor of astronomy, director of the Van Vleck Observatory (1915–44)
 Richard Slotkin (MAAE Wesleyan graduate) – Olin Professor of English and American Studies, emeritus; American Academy of Arts and Sciences
 William L. Storrs – faculty 1841–46, professor of law; also Congressman from Connecticut; Chief Justice of the Connecticut Supreme Court
 Max Tishler – faculty 1970–89, professor, chemistry; National Medal of Science, Priestley Medal, National Inventors Hall of Fame
 Hing Tong – former chairman, mathematics department; known for providing the original proof of the Katětov–Tong insertion theorem
 Charles Kittredge True – faculty 1849–60, professor of intellectual and moral science
 Jennifer Tucker, historian and biologist
 John Monroe Van Vleck (1850 Wesleyan graduate) – faculty 1853–1904, emeritus 1904–12, professor of mathematics and astronomy
 Clarence E. Walker - associate professor of history
 Jan Willis – emeritus professor of religion and East Asian Studies
 Woodrow Wilson – faculty 1888–90; professor, chair, history and political economy; 13th president, Princeton University; 28th President, United States; Nobel Peace Prize
 Robert Coldwell Wood – former faculty, political scientist; former 1st Undersecretary and 2nd United States Secretary of Housing and Urban Development (1963–69)
 John Wrench – former professor of mathematics, pioneer in using computers for mathematical calculations; National Academy of Sciences
 Gary Yohe – current faculty, professor of economics; senior member, coordinating lead author, Intergovernmental Panel on Climate Change; co-recipient, 2007 Nobel Peace Prize
 Elisabeth Young-Bruehl – faculty 1974–c. 1995; biographer and psychotherapist

Arts and letters, past and present

 Chimamanda Ngozi Adichie – visiting writer 2008; MacArthur Fellowship (2008)
 John Ashbery – Millet Writing Fellow 2010; MacArthur Fellowship; 1976 Pulitzer Prize for Poetry; National Book Award, National Book Critics Circle Award
 Jeanine Basinger – current faculty, c. 1970–present, film scholar
 Anselm Berrigan – current faculty, poet, Best American Poetry of 2002, 2004
 Ed Blackwell – artist in residence, late 1970s; recorded extensively with Ornette Coleman
 Anthony Braxton – John Spencer Camp Professor of Music, retired 2013; MacArthur Fellowship; 2014 National Endowment for the Arts Jazz Master
 Robert E. Brown – faculty 1962–1979, professor of music, founded ethnomusicology program at Wesleyan
 Neely Bruce – current faculty, professor of music; composer, conductor, pianist, scholar of American music
 John Cage – faculty 1961, 1968, composer; affiliated with Wesleyan and collaborated with members of its Music Department from 1950s until his death in 1992
 Tony Connor – current faculty, British poet and playwright, Fellow of the Royal Society of Literature
 Junot Díaz – Millet Writing Fellow 2009; 2008 Pulitzer Prize for Fiction, National Book Critics Circle Award; MacArthur Fellowship (2012)
 Annie Dillard – English faculty for 21 years; 1975 Pulitzer Prize for General Non-Fiction
 Eiko & Koma – MacArthur Fellowship; Japanese performance duo; Eiko is current faculty
 T. S. Eliot – Nobel Prize in Literature (1948), Presidential Medal of Freedom (1964); in the 1960s, special editorial consultant to Wesleyan University Press
 Jimmy Garrison – artist in residence, ?–1976, bassist; long association with John Coltrane
 Angel Gil-Ordoñez – former professor of music and Director of Orchestra Studies; Spanish conductor
 Dana Gioia – visiting writer 1986–1989, American Book Award; Chairman, National Endowment for the Arts (2003–2009)
 Roger Mathew Grant – current faculty, expert in music theory
 Donald Hall – 14th United States Poet Laureate, 2006–07; National Book Critics Circle Award, 1955; member, editorial board for poetry, Wesleyan University Press (1958–64)
 Jon B. Higgins (Wesleyan B.A., M.A., PhD) – faculty 1978–84, scholar and performer of Carnatic Music, Fulbright Scholar
 Jay Hoggard (Wesleyan B.A. 1976) – current faculty, vibraphonist
 Ana Paula Höfling – professor of dance
 Paul Horgan – adjunct professor of English, 1961–71; professor emeritus and permanent author-in-residence, 1971–95; twice winner, Pulitzer Prize for History (1955 and 1976); Bancroft Prize for History
 Susan Howe – distinguished visiting writer and faculty 2010–11, 2011 Bollingen Prize
 Quiara Alegría Hudes – Shapiro Distinguished Professor of Writing and Theater 2014–2016, visiting writer 2011–12; 2012 Pulitzer Prize for Drama
 Paul LaFarge – writer, English faculty as of 2010; taught writing at the university on and off since 2002
 Alvin Lucier – John Spencer Camp Professor of Music 1970–2010; pioneering experimental composer
 William Manchester – faculty 1955–2004; former emeritus professor of history; 2001 National Humanities Medal; The Death of a President, American Caesar
 David P. McAllester – faculty 1947–86; professor, anthropology and music; co-founded Society for Ethnomusicology
 Makanda Ken McIntyre – former professor of music
 Lisa Moore – current faculty, international classical and jazz pianist
 V. S. Naipaul – former visiting professor; Nobel Prize in Literature in fiction (2001); Man Booker Prize (1971)
 Palghat Kollengode Viswanatha Narayanaswamy – artist in residence; considered to be among the finest Carnatic vocalists of the 20th century
 Ramnad Raghavan – faculty for many years, South Indian virtuoso of the mridangam
 S. Ramanathan (Wesleyan PhD, ethnomusicology) – faculty, singer (Carnatic music), and musicologist
 T. Ranganathan – first artist in residence, beginning in 1963; Carnatic virtuoso of the mridangam
 Jean Redpath – artist in residence, 1972–76
 Kit Reed – science- and speculative-fiction writer, resident writer and creative writing faculty, 2008-2017
 F.D. Reeve – faculty 1962–2002 (English and Russian literature), emeritus professor of letters (2002–2013); poet, translator
 Phyllis Rose – faculty 1969–2005, professor of English; literary critic, essayist, biographer
 George Saunders – visiting writer, MacArthur Fellowship (2006)
 Jonathan Schell – journalist, author, visiting professor in writing 2000–02
 Dani Shapiro – current faculty, professor of creative writing
 Paula Sharp – former writer in residence in the College of Letters (2003–12)
 Joseph Siry – current faculty, leading architectural historian, professor of art and art history
 Mark Slobin – current faculty, professor of music
 Charles Wilbert Snow – faculty 1921–1952; poet, professor of English; coach, debate team; founder, The Cardinal (literary magazine); Lieutenant Governor and Governor of Connecticut
 Mark Strand – former visiting professor; fourth United States Poet Laureate, 1990–91; MacArthur Fellowship; 1999 Pulitzer Prize for Poetry
 Sumarsam (Wesleyan M.A. 1976) – current faculty, former artist in residence; Javanese virtuoso, scholar of the gamelan
 Marcus Thompson – former faculty, violist and viola d'amore player, recording artist and educator
 Clifford Thornton – faculty 1969–75, jazz composer and musician, UNESCO counsellor on African-American education 1976–87, Black Panther Minister of Art
 Deb Olin Unferth – former professor of English and creative writing; nominee, 2012 National Book Critics Circle Award; Pushcart Prizes 2005, 2011
 T. Viswanathan (Wesleyan PhD, ethnomusicology 1975) – former professor of music, Carnatic flute virtuoso, 1992 National Heritage Fellowship recipient
 Richard Wilbur – faculty c. 1950–80; professor of English; second United States Poet Laureate; twice winner, Pulitzer Prize (1957, 1989); Bollingen Prize
 Elizabeth Willis – current faculty, poet; teaches creative writing and literature
 Michiyo Yagi – visiting professor in late 1980s; Japanese musician, koto virtuoso
 Gorō Yamaguchi – artist in residence, Japanese shakuhachi (vertical bamboo flute) virtuoso
 Anuradha Sriram, India playback singer

Alumni

Balzan Prize winners

 Charles Coulston Gillispie (1940) – 1997 Balzan Prize; George Sarton Medal; Pfizer Award; professor, history of science, Emeritus, Princeton University
 Russell J. Hemley (1977) – physicist; 2005 Balzan Prize (with Ho-Kwang Mao); Director, Carnegie Institution for Science; National Academy of Sciences

Pulitzer prizes

 Ethan Bronner (1976) – Pulitzer Prize (Explanatory Journalism, 2001); Battle for Justice (The New York Public Library, one of the 25 best books of 1989)
 Lisa Chedekel (1982) – Pulitzer Prize for Breaking News Reporting (1999); finalist, Pulitzer (2007); George Polk Award; Selden Ring Award for Investigative Reporting; Worth Bingham Prize
 Seth Faison (1981) – journalist, Pulitzer Prize for Spot News Reporting (1994); former Bureau Chief, New York Times (1995–2000); author
 Sue Fox (B.A. high honors 1993?) – Pulitzer Prize for Breaking News Reporting (2004)
 David Garrow (1975) – Pulitzer Prize for Biography (1987); Fellow, Homerton College, Cambridge University
 Alan C. Miller (1976) – Pulitzer Prize for National Reporting (2003), Goldsmith Prize for Investigative Reporting (1997), George Polk Award (1996)
 Lin-Manuel Miranda (2002) – playwright, winner of Pulitzer Prize in Drama (2016) for Hamilton
 Lucille Renwick (1987) – 2 Pulitzers: Pulitzer Prize for Breaking News Reporting (1998); Pulitzer Prize for Spot News Reporting (1995)
 Barbara Roessner (1975) – Pulitzer Prize for Breaking News Reporting (1999); finalist, Pulitzer (2007, 2003, 2001); Executive Editor, Hearst Connecticut Newspapers (2012–), Managing Editor (2006–09)
 Leland Stowe (1921) – Pulitzer Prize (Correspondence, 1930); runner-up for second Pulitzer (Correspondence, 1940)
 Lawrence Rogers Thompson (B.A.) – Pulitzer Prize for Biography of Robert Frost (1971); professor of English, Princeton University
 Stephen Schiff (1972) – journalist; finalist, Pulitzer Prize for Criticism (1983)
 Wadada Leo Smith composer, musician; finalist, Pulitzer Prize for music (2013)

MacArthur Fellows
The following alumni are fellows of the MacArthur Fellows Program (known as the "genius grant") from the John D. and Catherine T. MacArthur Foundation. As this is an interdisciplinary award, recipients are listed here in addition to their listing in their field of accomplishment.

 Ruth Behar 1977–88 (first Latin woman named a) MacArthur Fellow; professor, anthropology, University of Michigan; poet, writer
 Majora Carter 1984–2005 MacArthur Fellow; environmental justice advocate; urban revitalization strategist; public radio host; 2011 Peabody award
 Mary Halvorson 2019 MacArthur Fellow; avant-garde jazz composer and guitarist
 James Longley 1994–2009 MacArthur Fellow; documentarian, including Gaza Strip, Iraq in Fragments, Sari's Mother
 Lin-Manuel Miranda  2015 MacArthur Fellow; Broadway actor, composer, playwright, and lyricist (In the Heights, Hamilton); 2008 Tony Award winner for Best Musical and Best Original Score, 2008 Grammy Award for Best Musical Show Album, 2016 Pulitzer Prize for Drama winner.

Academy, Emmy, Tony, and Grammy awards

Academy awards and nominations

 Miguel Arteta (1989) – Student Academy Award, Independent Spirit John Cassavetes Award; film director (Chuck & Buck, The Good Girl, Youth in Revolt, Cedar Rapids)
 Shari Springer Berman (1985) – Academy Award-nominated screenwriter, director, American Splendor (Best Adapted Screenplay); The Extra Man, Cinema Verite
 Akiva Goldsman (1983) – Academy Award-winning screenwriter, A Beautiful Mind (2001, Best Adapted Screenplay); Golden Globe Award; The Client, A Time to Kill
 Michael Gottwald (2006) – producer; 2012 nomination, Academy Award for Best Picture
 Dan Janvey (2006) – director, producer; 2012 nomination, Academy Award for Best Picture
 Sebastian Junger (1984) – documentarian; Restrepo; 2011 Academy Award nomination; Grand Jury Prize, Best Documentary, 2010 Sundance Film Festival
 Kenneth Lonergan – playwright, screenwriter, director; nominated for two Academy Awards (2002, Gangs of New York; 2000, You Can Count on Me) and Pulitzer Prize (2001, The Waverley Gallery); Grand Jury Prize, Best Drama, 2000 Sundance Film Festival (You Can Count on Me)
 James Longley (1994) – documentarian; Student Academy Award (1994); Academy Award-nominated Iraq in Fragments (2007), Academy Award-nominated Sari's Mother (2008); three jury awards, 2006 Sundance Film Festival
 Laurence Mark (1971) – producer, nominated for three Academy Awards: Jerry Maguire, As Good as It Gets, Working Girl; Dreamgirls (won Golden Globe Award for Best Motion Picture – Musical or Comedy); Independent Spirit Award; Julie & Julia
 Roger Weisberg (1975) – documentarian; nominated for two Academy Awards (2000, Sound and Fury; 2002, Why Can't We Be a Family Again) 1994 Peabody Award (Road Scholar); 100 other awards
 Paul Weitz (1988) – Academy Award-nominated director, American Pie; About a Boy, Cirque du Freak: The Vampire's Assistant, Little Fockers
 Joss Whedon (1987) – Academy Award-nominated screenwriter, Toy Story; Speed; director, screenwriter, Buffy the Vampire Slayer, Serenity, The Cabin in the Woods, The Avengers
 Allie Wrubel – Academy Award-winning composer, songwriter, Song of the South, song, "Zip-a-Dee-Doo-Dah" (1947, Best Original Song); Songwriters Hall of Fame
 Benh Zeitlin (2004) – filmmaker, composer, director; his Beasts of the Southern Wild garnered four 2012 Academy Award nominations; 2012 Caméra d'Or award, Cannes Film Festival; 2012 Grand Jury Prize, Dramatic, Sundance Film Festival

Emmy awards

Emmy awards in journalism

 David Brancaccio (1982) – Emmy Award-winning newscaster and host, NOW on PBS; DuPont-Columbia Award; Peabody Award
 Dina Kaplan (1993) – 2007 Emmy Award for Spot News
 Randall Pinkston (1972) – three-time Emmy Award-winning television journalist; RTNDA Edward R. Murrow Award
 Stephen Talbot (1970) – television reporter, writer, producer for PBS "Frontline"; two Emmy Awards, two Peabody Awards; Edward Murrow Award; DuPont-Columbia Award; Edgar Allan Poe Award

Emmy awards in film and television

 Phil Abraham – Emmy Award-winning film and television cinematographer, director
 Dana Delany (1978) – two Emmy Awards; actress; television shows China Beach, Presidio Med, Desperate Housewives, Body of Proof; films Tombstone, Fly Away Home
 Janet Grillo (1980) – Emmy Award-winning producer; writer and director
 Evan Katz – Emmy Award-winning writer, executive producer of television series 24
 David Kohan (1986) – Emmy Award-winning co-creator, executive producer, Will & Grace and Good Morning, Miami
 Diane Kolyer – Emmy Award winner for Outstanding Children's Program (2004); director, writer, producer
 Michael E. Knight (1980) – three Emmy Awards; actor, best known for his role as Tad Martin on All My Children
 Jeffrey Lane – five Emmy Awards, Golden Globe, two Peabody Awards, three Writers Guild of America Awards; author, television scriptwriter, film producer
 Alan Levin (1946) – three Emmy Awards; maker of documentaries
 Marc Levin (1973) – three Emmy Awards (1988, 1989, 1999), documentary filmmaker; 1998 Caméra d'Or award, Cannes Film Festival; 1998 Grand Jury Prize, Sundance Film Festival; 1997 DuPont-Columbia Award; founder Blowback Productions (1988)
 Bruce McKenna (1984) – Emmy Award-winning television and movie producer, writer; Writers Guild Award; The Pacific
 Jim Margolis – six Emmy Awards (2012, 2011, 2010, 2009, 2008, 2007), writer, producer, co-executive producer, The Daily Show with Jon Stewart
 Mary McDonagh Murphy – six Emmy Awards; independent documentary film director, writer and producer
 Owen Renfroe – three Emmy Awards; three Directors Guild of America Awards, television soap opera director; former film editor
 Matthew Senreich (1996) – Emmy Award-winning screenwriter, director; producer, Robot Chicken
 Bill Sherman (2002) – Emmy Award-winning composer (2011); currently Musical Director of Sesame Street
 Matthew Weiner (1987) – 2011 Time's "100 Most Influential People in the World"; The Atlantic, one of 21 Brave Thinkers 2011; nine Emmy Awards, three Golden Globes; creator, executive producer, writer, Mad Men; screenwriter, supervising producer, The Sopranos
 Roger Weisberg (1975) – documentarian; Emmy Award–winning series Help Yourself; Dupont-Columbia Award
 Joss Whedon (1987) – Emmy Award, Nebula Award, two Hugo Awards; writer, creator, producer, director, Buffy the Vampire Slayer, Angel, Firefly, Dollhouse, Dr. Horrible's Sing-Along Blog
 Bradley Whitford (1981) – Emmy Award-winning actor; television dramas, The West Wing, Studio 60 on the Sunset Strip; films, Billy Madison, The Sisterhood of the Traveling Pants
 Bill Wrubel (1985) – three Emmy Awards (2010, 2011, 2012); co-executive producer, writer Modern Family, Ugly Betty, Will & Grace

Tony and Grammy awards

 Bill Cunliffe (1978) – jazz pianist, composer, arranger; 2009 Grammy Award; won 1989 Thelonious Monk International Jazz Piano Award; won several Down Beat Awards; 2 Emmy nominations; 4 Grammy nominations
 Thomas Kail (1999) – director; Tony Award winner for Hamilton and nominee for In the Heights
 Jorge Arevalo Mateus (PhD) – 2008 Grammy Award (Best Historical Recording); Curator/Archivist, Woody Guthrie Foundation and Archives (1996–)
 Lin-Manuel Miranda (2002) – creator, composer, lyricist, actor: In the Heights (two Tony Awards, 2008, Best Musical and Best Original Score; Grammy Award, 2009) and Hamilton (three Tony Awards, 2016, Best Musical, Best Book of A Musical, Best Original Score; Grammy Award, 2016)
 Jeffrey Richards (producer) (1969) – producer; six Tony Awards; including 2012 Tony Award for Best Revival of a Musical, 2011 The Gershwins' Porgy and Bess (Paulus adaptation); August: Osage County (Pulitzer Prize, five Tony Awards); co-producer, Spring Awakening (three Tony Awards, Grammy Award)
 L. Shankar (PhD) – Tamil Indian virtuoso violinist, composer; professor of music; 1994 Grammy Award; 1996 Grammy nomination
 Bill Sherman (2002) – orchestrator, arranger; 2008 Tony Award, Best Orchestration (In the Heights), 2009 Grammy Award
 Frank Wood (1984) – Tony Award-winning actor (Side Man); Angels in America

Academia

Presidents, chancellors, founders

 Samuel Rogers Adams (B.A. 1851, M.A. 1856) – president, predecessor of the University of Evansville (1856–61)
 David Allison (B.A. 1859, M.A. 1862) – president, Mount Allison University, Canada (1891–1911); 2nd president, Mount Allison College, Canada (1869–78)
 John W. Beach (1845) – 7th president, Wesleyan University (1880–87)
 Joseph Beech (1899) – co-founder, 1st president, West China Union University in Chengtu, China
 Douglas J. Bennet (1959) – 15th president, Wesleyan (1995–07)
 Katherine Bergeron (1980) – 11th president, Connecticut College (2014–)
 Anthony S. Caprio (1967) – 5th president, Western New England College (since 1996)
 Hiram Chodosh (1985) – 5th president elect of Claremont McKenna College (2013–)
 Charles Collins (1837) – 1st president Emory and Henry College (1832–52); 11th president, Dickinson College (1852–60)
 Edward Cooke (1838) – 1st president, Lawrence University (1853–59); 2nd President, Claflin Universityb (HBCU) (1872–84); Board of Examiners, Harvard University
 Joseph Cummings (1840) – 5th president, Wesleyan (1857–75); 5th president, Northwestern University (1881–90); president, predecessor of Syracuse University (Genesee College)
 W. H. Daniels – interim president, Pentecostal Collegiate Institute, antecedent of Eastern Nazarene College
 Joseph Denison (1840) – co-founder, 1st president, Kansas State University (1863–73); president, Baker University (1874–79); 1st president, Blue Mont Central College
 Nicholas Dirks (1972) – 10th chancellor-designate, University of California, Berkeley (effective June 1, 2013); professor, anthropology, history, and dean, faculty of arts and sciences, Columbia University
 Paul Douglass – 6th president, American University (1941–52)
 Gordon P. Eaton (1951) – 12th president, Iowa State University (1986–90)
 Ignatius Alphonso Few (1838) – co-founder and first president, Emory University
 Cyrus David Foss (1854) – 6th president, Wesleyan (1875–80)
 E. K. Fretwell (1944) – president, University at Buffalo (1967–78); 2nd chancellor, University of North Carolina at Charlotte (1979–89); interim president, University of Massachusetts (1991–92); interim president, University of Florida (1998)
 Charles Wesley Gallagher (A.B. 1870, A.M. 1873) – 6th president, Lawrence University (1889–93)
 Bishop John W. Gowdy (1897) – president, Anglo-Chinese College, in Fuzhou, China (1904–23); president, Fukien Christian University (1923–27)
 A. LeRoy Greason (1944) – 12th president, Bowdoin College (1981–90)
 William R. Greiner (1955) – 13th president, University at Buffalo (1991–03); also professor, dean, and provost of the University at Buffalo Law School
 Burton Crosby Hallowell – 9th president, Tufts University (1967–76)
 Abram W. Harris – 14th president, Northwestern University (1906–16); 1st president, University of Maine (1896–06); president, Maine State College (1893–96)
 Bishop Erastus Otis Haven (1842) – 2nd president, University of Michigan (1863–69); 6th president, Northwestern University; 2nd Chancellor, Syracuse University; overseer, Harvard University
 Clark T. Hinman – 1st president, Northwestern University (1853–54 (death)); president, Albion College (1846–53)
 Francis S. Hoyt (1844) – 1st president, Willamette University (1853–60)
 Harry Burns Hutchins (1870) – 4th president, University of Michigan (1910–20), twice acting president; dean, University of Michigan Law School; organized law department, Cornell University
 Isaac J. Lansing (B.A. 1872, graduate student 1872–73, M.A. 1875) – president, predecessor, Clark Atlanta University (HBCU) (1874–76)
 Gregory Mandel -  Dean at Temple University Beasley School of Law
 Oliver Marcy (1846) – twice acting president, Northwestern University (1876–81, 1890); established the Northwestern University Museum of Natural History, served as its curator
 Anthony Marx (1981, attended 1977–79) – 18th president, Amherst College (2003–11); president, New York Public Library (2011–)
 Russell Zelotes Mason (B.A. 1844, M.A. 1847) – 2nd president, Lawrence University (1861–65); acting president, (1859–61); mayor, Appleton, Wisconsin
 William Williams Mather (A.M. 1834) – acting president, Ohio University (1845)
 Bishop Samuel Sobieski Nelles (1846) – 1st chancellor, president, Victoria University in the University of Toronto, Ontario, Canada (1884–87); president, Victoria College
 John McClintock (1834) – 1st president, Drew Theological Seminary (later, Drew University)
 Frank L. McVey (B.A.) – 4th president, University of North Dakota (1909–17); 3rd president, University of Kentucky (1917–40); economist
 John W. North – co-founder, University of Minnesota; founding member of its board of regents (1851–60); wrote university's charter
 Henry S. Noyes (1848) – twice interim president, Northwestern University (1854–56, 1860–67)
 Brother John R. Paige (M.A.) – president, Holy Cross College (2010–); prior vicar general, the Congregation of Holy Cross in Rome
 Bishop Charles Henry Payne (A.B. 1856, A.M. 1859) – 3rd president, Ohio Wesleyan University (1876–88)
 Humphrey Pickard (B.A. 1839) – 1st president, Mount Allison Wesleyan College, Canada (later known as Mount Allison University) (1862–1869)
 Matias Perez y Ponce (B.A.) – founder and first president, Cagayan Teachers College (Philippine Islands) (1948–1968)
 John A. Randall (1881) – 4th president, Rochester Institute of Technology (1922–36)
 George Edward Reed (1869) – 15th president, Dickinson College (1889–1911); with William Tickett, re-established Dickinson School of Law in 1890
 David Rhodes (1968) – 2nd president, School of Visual Arts (incumbent as of 2010)
 Edward Loranus Rice (A.B. 1892, Sc.D. 1927) – acting president, Ohio Wesleyan University (1938–39); biologist; scientific consultant to Clarence Darrow before Scopes Trial
 William North Rice (1865) – thrice acting president, Wesleyan University (1907, 1908–09, 1918); geologist, earned first PhD. in geology granted by Yale University
 B. T. Roberts – founder, predecessor of Roberts Wesleyan College (named in his honor)
 Michael S. Roth (1978) – 16th president, Wesleyan University (since 2007); 8th president, California College of the Arts (2000–07)
 Richard S. Rust (1841) – co-founder, 1st president, Wilberforce University (HBCU); co-founder, Rust College (HBCU) (named in his honor)
 Richard W. Schneider (M.A. 1973) – 23rd president, Norwich University (since 1992)
 Edwin O. Smith (1893) – acting president, Connecticut Agricultural College (now the University of Connecticut) (1908)
 George Mckendree Steele (B.A. 1850, M.A. 1853) 3rd president Lawrence University (1865–79)
 Samuel Nowell Stevens (1921) – 9th president, Grinnell College (1940–54)
 Harold Syrett (1935) – President of Brooklyn College
 Beverly Daniel Tatum (1975) – 9th president, Spelman College (HBCU) (2002–); acting president, Mount Holyoke College (2002)
 John Hanson Twombly (1843) – 5th president, University of Wisconsin–Madison (1871–74); co-founder, Boston University; overseer, Harvard University
 Joseph Urgo (M.A.) – president, St. Mary's College of Maryland (since 2010); former acting president, Hamilton College (2009)
 Daniel C. Van Norman (1838) — educator, clergyman, and school founder
 John Monroe Van Vleck (1850) – twice acting president, Wesleyan (1872–73, 1887–89); astronomer, mathematician
 Francis Voigt (1962) – co-founder, president, New England Culinary Institute (incumbent as of 2010)
 Clarence Abiathar Waldo (A.B. 1875, A.M. 1878) – twice acting president, Rose–Hulman Institute of Technology (1885–86, 1888–89); mathematician
 Henry White Warren (1853) – co-founder, Iliff School of Theology
 William Fairfield Warren (1853) – co-founder, Wellesley College in 1870; 1st President, Boston University (1873–03); acting president, Boston University School of Theology (1866–73)
 Robert Weisbuch (1968) – 11th president, Drew University (since 2005); former president, Woodrow Wilson National Fellowship Foundation
 Herbert George Welch (B.A. 1887, M.A. 1890) – 5th president, Ohio Wesleyan University (1905–16)
 Bishop Erastus Wentworth (B.A. 1837) – 7th president, McKendree College (1846–50)
 Georg Whitaker (1861) – 4th president, Wiley College (1888–91) (HBCU); 7th president, Willamette University (1891–93); president, Portland University
 Alexander Winchell (B.A. 1847, M.A. 1850) – 1st chancellor, Syracuse University (1872–74)
 Elizabeth C. Wright (1897) – principal co-counder and secretary, registrar, and later 1st bursar, Connecticut College
 Henry Merritt Wriston (B.A. 1911, M.A.) – 11th president, Brown University (1937–55); 8th president, Lawrence University (1925–37); father of Walter B. Wriston (see below)
 Kennedy Odede (2012); founder; Shining Hope for Communities, Nairobi, Kenya

Professors and scholars

 David Abram (1980) – philosopher, cultural ecologist
 Kenneth R. Andrews (M.A. 1932) – academic credited with foundational role (at Harvard Business School) in introducing, popularizing concept of business strategy
 Elliot Aronson (M.A. 1956) – among 100 most eminent psychologist of 20th century
 John William Atkinson (1947) – psychologist, pioneered the scientific study of human motivation, achievement, and behavior
 Wilbur Olin Atwater (1865) – chemist, leader in development of agricultural chemistry
 Adam J. Berinsky (1992) –  professor of political science, Massachusetts Institute of Technology
 Albert Francis Blakeslee (1896) – botanist, director of the Carnegie Institution for Science; professor, Smith College
 George Hubbard Blakeslee (A.B. 1893, A.M. 1897) – professor of history, Clark University; founded the first American journal devoted to international relations
 Jennifer Finney Boylan (1980) – author, professor of English, Colby College (1988–)
 Lael Brainard – former professor of applied economics, MIT Sloan School of Management
 Kenneth Bruffee – emeritus professor of English; wrote first peer tutoring handbook
 Leonard Burman (1975) – economist, tax-policy expert; Professor of public affairs, Maxwell School of Citizenship and Public Affairs, Syracuse University
 Leslie Cannold (1987) – academic ethicist; Australian public intellectual
 John Bissell Carroll (1937) – psychologist; known for his contributions to psychology, educational linguistics and psychometrics
 John C. Cavadini (B.A. 1975) – professor and chair, Theology Department, University of Notre Dame; Vatican adviser; Order of St. Gregory the Great
 KC Chan – former professor of finance and dean, business management, Hong Kong University of Science and Technology; Hong Kong Secretary for Financial Services and the Treasury (since 2007);
 Arthur W. Chickering (1950) – educational researcher; known for contributions to student development theories
 John H. Coatsworth (1963) – historian of Latin America; provost, Columbia University; dean, Columbia University School of International and Public Affairs (2007–12)
 Marion Cohen (PhD in mathematics (distribution theory)) – mathematician and poet
 Kate Cooper – Professor of Ancient History at the University of Manchester, England
 Jeffrey N. Cox (1975) – professor of English literature; leading scholar of late-18th to early-19th-century theater and drama
 Norman Daniels (1964) – philosopher, ethicist, and bioethicist, Harvard University
 Ram Dass (M.A.) – former professor of psychology, Harvard University; spiritual teacher; wrote book Be Here Now
 Marc Davis (1989) – founding director, Yahoo! Research Berkeley
 Walter Dearborn (B.A. 1900, M.A.) – pioneering educator, experimental psychologist; helped establish field of reading education; longtime professor, Harvard University
 Daniel Dennett (attended) – professor of philosophy, Tufts University; Jean Nicod Prize
 Henrik Dohlman (1982) – professor and chair of pharmacology, University of North Carolina at Chapel Hill
 Raymond D. Fogelson – anthropologist; a founder of the subdiscipline of ethnohistory; professor, University of Chicago
 Virginia Page Fortna (1990) – professor of political science at Columbia University
 Michael Foster – professor of Japanese literature, culture, and folklore; author
 Daniel Z. Freedman – physicist, professor of physics and applied mathematics, Massachusetts Institute of Technology; co-discovered supergravity
 David Garrow (1975) – Pulitzer Prize for Biography; fellow, Homerton College, Cambridge University
 Mark H. Gelber (1972) – American-Israeli scholar of comparative literature and German-Jewish literature and culture
 Gayatri Gopinath (1994) – scholar of social and cultural analysis; director, Asian/Pacific/American Studies, New York University
 Adolf Grünbaum (1943) – philosopher of science and critic of psychoanalysis and Karl Popper
 Saidiya Hartman – professor of African-American literature and history, Columbia University (as of 2010)
 Robert H. Hayes (1958) – Philip Caldwell Professor of Business Administration (1966–2000), Emeritus (since 2001), Harvard Business School
 Ole Holsti (MAT 1956) – political scientist, Duke University (1974–1998), emeritus chair (since 1998); creator, inherent bad faith model
 Gerald Holton (1941) – emeritus professor of physics and professor of the History of Physics, Harvard University
 William G. Howell (1993) – Sydney Stein Professor in American Politics at Chicago Harris and a professor in the Department of Political Science and the College at the University of Chicago
 Shelly Kagan – Clark Professor of Philosophy, Yale University; former Henry R. Luce Professor of Social Thought and Ethics, Yale University
 Douglas Kahn (M.A. 1987) – Professor of Media and Innovation, National Institute for Experimental Arts, University of New South Wales; Professor Emeritus in Science and Technology Studies, University of California, Davis; 2006 Guggenheim Fellowship
 Edwin W. Kemmerer – economist; economic adviser to foreign governments worldwide; professor, Princeton University
 William L. Lane – New Testament theologian and professor of biblical studies
 Seth Lerer (1976) – professor of English and comparative literature, Stanford University
 Peter Lipton (1976) – Hans Rausing professor and head of the Department of History and Philosophy of Science, University of Cambridge
 Richard M. Locke (1981)- Provost, Schreiber Family Professor of Political Science and International and Public Affairs at Brown University; former deputy dean, MIT Sloan School of Management
 Silas Laurence Loomis (1844) – professor of chemistry, physiology, and toxicology, Georgetown University
 Delmar R. Lowell – historian and genealogist
 Saree Makdisi (1987) – professor of English and comparative literature, University of California, Los Angeles; also literary critic
 Harold Marcuse (physics, 1979) – professor of modern and contemporary German history
 Harold Marks – British educator
 David McClelland (1938) – noted for his work on achievement motivation; co-creator of scoring system for Thematic Apperception Test; professor, Harvard University
 Lee C. McIntyre – philosopher of science
 Elmer Truesdell Merrill (1881) – Latin scholar; professor of Latin, University of Chicago
 Joseph C. Miller (1961) – professor of history, University of Virginia (since 1972)
 Indiana Neidell (1989) – historian, host and lead writer of The Great War YouTube channel
 Eugene Allen Noble (1891) – president of Centenary University 1902–1908, 3rd president of Goucher College from 1908–1911, 16th president of Dickinson College from 1911–1914
 Tavia Nyong'o (B.A.) – historian, Kenyan-American cultural critic; professor, New York University; Marshall Scholarship
 Thomas Pickard – Canadian professor of mathematics, Mount Allison University (1848–1869)
 Edward Bennett Rosa (1886) – Elliott Cresson Medal, Franklin Institute; professor of physics (1891–1901)
 Horace Jacobs Rice (1905) – lawyer, Associate Dean, Northeastern University School of Law, Dean of the College of Western New England School of Law from
 Paul North Rice (1910) – librarian, Director of Reference at the New York Public Library, Director of NYU libraries, Director of the Wesleyan University Library 1953-56
 Juliet Schor – professor, sociology, Boston College; professor, economics (for 17 years), Harvard University
 Sanford L. Segal (1958) mathematician, professor of mathematics, historian of science and mathematics
 Ira Sharkansky (1960) professor emeritus, political science, Hebrew University of Jerusalem; fellow National Academy of Public Administration
 Steven M. Sheffrin (1972) economist and expert on property tax limitations in the U.S.
 Horst Siebert – German economist; chair, economic theory, University of Kiel (1989–2003), University of Konstanz (1984–89), University of Mannheim (1969–84)
 Neil Asher Silberman – archaeologist and historian
 Richard Slotkin (MAEE) – professor of American studies (appears above), published by Wesleyan University Press
 Charles H. Smith (1972) – historian of science
 Stephen M. Engel, political scientist, professor at Bates College (1998)
 Robert Stalnaker – Laurance S. Rockefeller Professor of Philosophy, Massachusetts Institute of Technology; delivered the 2006–2007 John Locke Lectures at Oxford University
 H. Eugene Stanley (1962) – recipient, 2004 Boltzmann Medal; professor of physics, Boston University
 John Stauffer (MALS 1991) historian, 2002 Frederick Douglass Prize; chair, History of American Civilization and professor of English, Harvard
 Leland Stowe (1921) – 1930 Pulitzer Prize for Correspondence; recipient, Légion d'honneur; professor and journalist, University of Michigan in Ann Arbor (1955–1970), emeritus (1970)
 Mark C. Taylor (1968) – philosopher of religion, professor and chair of religion, Columbia University
 Lawrence Rogers Thompson (B.A.) – 1971 Pulitzer Prize for Biography; professor of English, Princeton University
 Edward Thorndike (1895) – psychologist; work led to theory of connectionism in artificial intelligence, neuroscience, philosophy of mind
 Lynn Thorndike (1902) – George Sarton Medal; historian; former professor, Columbia University
 Robert L. Thorndike (1941) – psychometrician and educational psychologist
 Robert M. Thorndike (1965) – professor of psychology known for several definitive textbooks on research procedures and psychometrics
 Charles Tiebout (1950) – economist; known for his development of Tiebout model; free rider problem; feet voting
 Aaron Louis Treadwell (B.S. 1888, M.S. 1890) – professor, biology and zoology, Vassar College
 Albert E. Van Dusen (MA, PhD) – historian, professor of history, University of Connecticut (1949–1983); Connecticut State Historian (1952–1985)
 Edward Burr Van Vleck (1884) – mathematician; professor, University of Wisconsin–Madison
 Christian K. Wedemeyer (1991) – history of religions faculty, University of Chicago Divinity School
 William Stone Weedon (M.S.) – University Professor, University of Virginia (philosophy, mathematics, logic, linguistic analysis)
 Kenneth D. West (1973) – professor of economics, University of Wisconsin–Madison; developed (with Whitney K. Newey) the Newey-West estimator
 Alexander Winchell (1847) – professor of physics and civil engineering, professor of geology and paleontology at University of Michigan
 Caleb Thomas Winchester (1869) – scholar of English literature

Art and architecture

 Natalia Alonso (economics 2000) – professional dancer, Complexions Contemporary Ballet; former dancer, Ballet Hispanico
 Steven Badanes (1967) – architect; known for his practice, teaching of design/build
 I Made Bandem (PhD, ethnomusicology) – Balinese dancer, author; rector, Indonesian Institute of the Arts, Yogyakarta
 Meredith Bergmann (1976) – sculptor, Women's Memorial (Boston)
 Lisa Brown (1993) – illustrator, author
 Momodou Ceesay (1970) – African fine artist and writer
 George Fisk Comfort – founder, Metropolitan Museum of Art, Everson Museum of Art
 Bradshaw Crandell – artist and illustrator; known as the "artist of the stars"
 Jeffrey Deitch (1974) – art dealer, curator, and, since 2010, director of the Museum of Contemporary Art, Los Angeles (MOCA)
 Vincent Fecteau (1992) – sculptor; work in permanent collections, Museum of Modern Art, San Francisco Museum of Modern Art
 Ralph Carlin Flewelling – architect
 Ellen Forney (1989) – cartoonist; nomination, 2007 Eisner Award; illustrated winner, 2007 National Book Award
 Danny Forster (1999) – architect; host, Extreme Engineering and Build It Bigger
 Renée Green – artist, sculptor; professor, MIT School of Architecture and Planning
 Lyle Ashton Harris (1988) – artist; collage, installation art, performance art
 Rachel Harrison (1989) – contemporary sculptor; multimedia artist; Calder Prize
 Morrison Heckscher (1962) – art historian and retired curator of the American Wing at the Metropolitan Museum of Art
 Dana Hoey (1989) – visual artist working with photography
 Jonathan Horowitz (1987) – multimedia artist; sculptor, sound installations
 Wayne Howard (1971) – graphic artist; created Midnight Tales
 Bruce Eric Kaplan – cartoonist (The New Yorker); television writer, (Six Feet Under; Seinfeld)
 Stephan Koplowitz (1979) – choreographer, director; 2004 Alpert Award in the Arts
 Abigail Levine – choreographer, dancer
 C. Stanley Lewis – artist, professor of art
 Paul Lewis 1998 – Rome Prize; director, Graduate Studies, Princeton University School of Architecture; principal, LTL Architects
 Glenn Ligon – contemporary conceptual artist; work in collection of the White House
 Nava Lubelski (1990) – contemporary artist
 Thomas McKnight (artist) – artist; work commissioned by then-U.S. President Bill Clinton and in the permanent collection, Metropolitan Museum of Art and Smithsonian Institution
 Alix Olson (1997) – performance artist, award-winning slam poet
 Jill Snyder (1979) – executive director, Museum of Contemporary Art Cleveland
 John Spike (1973) – art historian of Italian Renaissance; contemporary art critic
 Thomas Bangs Thorpe (1834–1837) – antebellum humorist, painter, illustrator, author
 Lori Verderame (MLS) – best known as "Dr. Lor"; appraiser, American TV show Auction Kings
 Robert Vickrey – artist and author; collections in Metropolitan Museum of Art, Whitney Museum of American Art, Brooklyn Museum, Corcoran Gallery of Art
 Ben Weiner (2003) – contemporary artist; oil painting, video
 Chris Wink – co-founder, Blue Man Group and Blue Man Creativity Center

Business

 Robert Allbritton (1992) – chairman, chief executive officer (CEO), Allbritton Communications; publisher, Politico
 Kenneth R. Andrews (M.A. 1932) – credited with foundational role (at Harvard Business School) in introducing, popularizing concept of business strategy
 Douglas J. Bennet – former CEO, National Public Radio (1983–93)
 William Bissell – sole managing director, Fabindia (1993–)
 Joshua Boger (1973) – founder (1989), chairman (1997–2006), CEO (1992-09), member of board (as of 2012), Vertex Pharmaceuticals
 Jonathan S. Bush – co-founder, president, CEO, athenahealth (as of 2012)
 Marc N. Casper (1990) – president, CEO, Thermo Fisher Scientific (2009–)
 KC Chan – ex-officio chairman, Kowloon–Canton Railway Corporation (2007–11); former director, Hong Kong Futures Exchange
 Tos Chirathivat (1985) – CEO, Central Retail
 Robert Crispin (1968) – former president, CEO, ING Group Investment Management Americas (2001–07)
 D. Ronald Daniel (1952) – managing partner (1976–88), McKinsey & Company; developed concept, critical success factors
 David S. Daniel – CEO, Spencer Stuart (as of 2012); former president, Louis Vuitton (N.A.); former CEO, Evian Waters of France (U.S.)
 Charles W. Denny III (1958) – president, chairman (2001–03), CEO (1992–03), Square D
 Stuart J. Ellman (B.A. 1988) -Co-founder and Managing Partner at RRE Ventures. President of Board at 92nd Street Y. Adjunct Professor Columbia Business School
 Edwin Deacon Etherington (1948) – former president, CEO, American Stock Exchange; 12th president, Wesleyan University
 Charles E. Exley, Jr. (1951) – president (1976–91), chairman (1984–91), CEO (1983–91), NCR Corporation
 Mallory Factor – merchant banker
 John B. Frank (B.A.) – managing principal (since 2007), general counsel (2001–06), Oaktree Capital Management
 Mansfield Freeman (1916) – one of original founders, AIG; philanthropist
 Jim Friedlich – media executive, Dow Jones & Company (1990–00); founding partner, ZelnickMedia (2001–11); founding partner, Empirical Media Advisors (since 2011)
 Stephen K. Friedman (1991) – president, MTV (since 2011)
 Michael Fries (1985) – president, vice chairman, CEO, Liberty Global (since 2005); former president, CEO, UnitedGlobalCom (2004–05)
 Pete Ganbarg (1988) – executive vice president/head of A&R, Atlantic Records (as of 2008)
 Walter B. Gerken (1948) – former president, CEO, Pacific Mutual Life Insurance; senior adviser, Boston Consulting Group
 Peter Glusker (1984) – CEO, Gilt Groupe Japan (since 2010); CEO, Gilt City Japan (since 2010)
 Christopher Graves (1981) – president, CEO, Ogilvy Public Relations Worldwide (since 2010); one of founders, Wall Street Journal Television
 Daniel Gregory (1951) – co-founder, former chairman, Greylock Partners
 John Hagel III (1972) – co-chairman, Deloitte Center for Edge Innovation (as of 2012); coined the term "infomediary"
 Henry I. Harriman –  co-founder, New England Power Company
 Charles James (1976) – vice president and general counsel, ChevronTexaco
 Dina Kaplan (1993) – co-founder and chief operating officer, blip.tv; Fortune'''s 2010 list, ten "Most Powerful Women Entrepreneurs"
 Herb Kelleher (1953) – founder, chairman, president, CEO, Southwest Airlines; chair, board of governors, Federal Reserve Bank of Dallas (2011–13)
 Edward M. Kennedy, Jr. (1983) – co-founder, president (as of 2012), Marwood Group (Wall Street investment firm); attorney (disability law)
 George M. La Monte (1884) – chairman, Prudential Insurance Company
 William J. Lansing (1980) – president, CEO, FICO (2012–); president, CEO, InfoSpace (2009–10); president, CEO, ValueVision Media (2004–07); partner, General Atlantic Partners (2001–03); CEO, NBC Internet (2000–01)Interview: Will Lansing, President and CEO, Mercury News. By Pete Carey. January 11, 2013. Retrieved January 23, 2013.
 Caroline Little (1981) – president, CEO, Newspaper Association of America (2011–); former CEO, Guardian News and Media (N.A.); former CEO, publisher, Washingtonpost.Newsweek Interactive
 Gary Loveman (1982) – president of the Aetna Inc. subsidiary Healthagen (since 2015); former chairman and former CEO of Caesars Entertainment Corporation; former professor, Harvard School of Business
 John Macy – president, Corporation for Public Broadcasting (1969–72); ran the Council of Better Business Bureau (1972–1979)
 Tom Matlack (1986) – entrepreneur, venture capitalist, and author
 Mary O. McWilliams – chair, Federal Reserve Bank of San Francisco Seattle Branch (term ending 2013); former president, CEO, Regence Blue Shield (2000–08)
 Nick Meyer – president, Paramount Vantage (until December 2008); former president, Lionsgate International, a division of Lionsgate Studios
 Donna Morea (1976) – president U.S., Europe, Asia, CGI Group (2004–) 
 Candace Nelson – founder, Sprinkles Cupcakes (2005); pastry chef; judge, television series Cupcake Wars (since 2010)
 Chuck Pagano (MALS) – chief technology officer, executive vice president of technology, ESPN; Sporting News "Power 100" list (2003 and 2006)Staff (January 5, 2006). "Stern Leads Commissioners Atop Sporting News' 'Power 100'", Sports Business Daily.  Retrieved November 15, 2012.
 Robert Pruzan (1985) – co-founding partner and principal, Centerview Partners; former CEO, Dresdner Kleinwort; former president, Wasserstein Perella Basar, Shanny (December 3, 2010). "Investment Banking Team of the Week: Centerview Partners".  Financial News.  Retrieved November 15, 2012.
 Gregg Ribatt – president, CEO, Collective Brands Performance Group (as of 2012); former president, CEO, Stride Rite
 John Rice (1974) – former president, CEO, Lever Brothers; former president, CEO, Unilever Foods, NA (2004–06)http://www.vendingmarketwatch.com/web/online/VendingMarketWatch-News/Unilevers-Americas-President-John-Rice-Will-Retire-Unilever-PLC-Will-Name-Its-First-Independent-Chairman/1$17780 .  VendingMarketWatch.  
 Dennis R. Robinson (1979) – former president, CEO, New Jersey Sports and Exposition Authority (2007–2012); chief operating officer, Grand Prix of America (2012–)Waters, Sharon (December 16, 2011).  "Robinson Leaving Sports Authority for Job with Formula One". NJBIZ. Retrieved November 15, 2012.
 Tom Rogers (1976) – president, CEO, TiVo (since 2005); former chairman, CEO, Primedia; former president, NBC Cable; founded CNBC, established MSNBC
 Jonah Sachs (1997) – Founder, CEO, Free Range Studios (1999–)
 Amy Schulman (1982) – senior vice president and general counsel, Pfizer; Forbes magazine 2009 list, "The World's Most Powerful Women"; National Law Journal's 2009 list, "20 Most Influential General Counsels"Staff (undated). "Pfizer Inc (PFE:New York)".  Bloomberg Businessweek.  Retrieved November 15, 2012.
 Jonathan I. Schwartz (1987) – president (2004–10), CEO (2006–10), Sun Microsystems; founder, CEO, Lighthouse Design (1989–96)
 Marc Shmuger (1980) – chairman, Universal Pictures (until October 2009)
 Frank V. Sica (1973) – vice-chairman, JetBlue Airways; president, Soros Fund Management (2000–03); Co-CEO, merchant banking (1997–98), managing director (1988–98), Morgan Stanley; managing partner, Tailwind Capital (since 2006)Staff (undated).  "Company Overview of Cancer Research Institute, Inc.". Bloomberg Businessweek.  Retrieved November 16, 2012.
 Jonathan Soros (1992) – hedge fund manager and political donor; son of George Soros.Staff (undate).  "Jonathan Soros". World Economic Forum.  Retrieved November 16, 2012.
 Gideon Stein – founder, former CEO, Omnipod, Inc. (now a division of Symantec)
 Steve Spinner – business executive, known for his work as an angel investor and advisor to Silicon Valley startups
 Gerald Tsai (1947–48) – founder, CEO, Primerica; pioneered use of performance funds
 Laura Ruth Walker (1979) – president, CEO, WNYC Public Radio Station, largest public-radio station in nation; named one of NYC's Most Powerful Women by Crain's New York Business (2009)
 Jeffrey Weitzen (1978) – former president, CEO, Gateway 2000
 Dan Wolf (1979) – founder, president, CEO, Cape Air (since 1988)
 Luke Wood (1991) – president, chief operating officer, Beats Electronics
 John F. Woodhouse (1953) – former president, CEO (1982–95), chairman (1985–99), senior chairman (1999–?), Sysco Corp. p
 Walter B. Wriston (1941) – commercial banker; former chairman (1979–84), CEO (1967–84), Citibank and Citicorp
 Strauss Zelnick (1979) – CEO (2011–), chairman (2007–), Take-Two Interactive; founder, managing partner, ZelnickMedia (2001–); president, chief operating officer (1989–93), 20th Century Fox; CEO, BMG Entertainment (1998–2000)Staff (undated).  "Take-Two Interactive Software (TTWO:NASDAQ GS)".  Bloomberg Businessweek.  Retrieved November 16, 2012.

Film, television, acting

Writers

 Carter Bays (1997) – writer, creator, executive producer, How I Met Your Mother Mark Bomback – screenwriter
 Jennifer Crittenden (1992) – writer, producer; two Humanitas Prizes, Seinfeld, Everybody Loves Raymond, The New Adventures of Old Christine Ed Decter (1979) – screenwriter, There's Something About Mary, The Santa Clause 2, The Santa Clause 3 Jennifer Flackett (1986) – screen/television writer, film director; Madeline,  Wimbledon, Little Manhattan, Nim's Island and Journey to the Center of the Earth Liz Friedman – writer, producer; Xena: Warrior Princess, Hack, The O.C., Numb3rs, House; co-creator, writer, executive producer, Young Hercules Liz W. Garcia (1999) – writer and producer; Dawson's Creek, Wonderfalls, Cold Case; co-created TNT series Memphis Beat David H. Goodman (1995) – television writer and producer, Fringe, Without a Trace Willy Holtzman – screenwriter, playwright; Humanitas Prize, Writers Guild Award, Peabody Award
 Alex Kurtzman – film, television screenwriter, producer; film: The Legend of Zorro, Mission: Impossible III, Transformers, Cowboys & Aliens, Star Trek, Star Trek Into Darkness; television: Fringe Catie Lazarus – writer, storyteller and talk show host
 Brett Matthews (1999) – writer, TV shows and comics
 Craig Thomas (1997) – writer, creator, executive producer How I Met Your Mother Joss Whedon (1987) – creator of Buffy the Vampire Slayer, Firefly and screenwriter & director The Avengers Zack Whedon (2002) – screenwriter
 Mike White (1992) – two Independent Spirit John Cassavetes Awards; co-creator, screenwriter, Enlightened; The Good Girl, Orange County, Chuck & Buck, and the HBO satire comedy miniseries The White Lotus.
 Kate Purdy (2001) - Writers Guild of America Award for Television: Animation; writer, producer, Cougar Town, Enlisted, The McCarthys, Bojack Horseman; co-creator, writer, executive producer, UndoneDirectors

 Phil Abraham – television director, cinematographer (The Sopranos, Mad Men, Orange is the New Black)
 Michael Arias (attended from age 16 to 18) – film director, producer, visual effects artist; filmmaker active primarily in Japan
 Miguel Arteta (1989) – film director (The Good Girl, Cedar Rapids)
 Michael Bay (1986) – film director (The Rock, Armageddon, Pearl Harbor, Bad Boys Series, Transformers film series)
 Eric Byler (1994) – film director (Charlotte Sometimes, My Life Disoriented, Americanese, TRE)
 Jan Eliasberg (1974) – director (television, theatre, and film)
 Michael Fields – director
 Ruben Fleischer (1997) – director; Zombieland, 30 Minutes or Less Thomas Kail (1999) – film and theatre director
 David Kendall – television and film director, producer, and writer; Growing Pains, Boy Meets World, Smart Guy, Hannah Montana, Dirty Deeds, The New Guy Daisy von Scherler Mayer (1988) – film director (Party Girl, Madeline, The Guru, Woo)
 Matthew Penn (1980) – director and producer of television and theatre; NYPD Blue, Law & Order, The Sopranos, House, Damages, The Closer, and Royal Pains Ray Tintori (2006) – director (film and music videos)
 Jon Turteltaub (1985) – film director (Cool Runnings, Phenomenon, While You Were Sleeping, National Treasure, 3 Ninjas)
 Matt Tyrnauer – director and journalist; Valentino: The Last Emperor (2009), short listed for an Academy Award nomination (2010)
 Alex Horwitz (2002) – director; "Hamilton's America"

 Benh Zeitlin (2004) – film director (Beasts of the Southern Wild)

Actors and others

 Bradley Whitford (1981) – actor, The West Wing, Get Out Edoardo Ballerini – actor, writer, director
 Jordan Belfi (2000) – actor
 Rob Belushi (2004) - actor, comedian and host of Get a Clue on Game Show Network.
 Amy Bloom (1975) – creator, State of Mind Peter Cambor (2001) – film and television actor; NCIS: Los Angeles
 Rob Campbell – actor (film, television, and stage)
 Hunter Carson (1998) – actor, screenwriter, producer, director
 Philip Casnoff (1971) – Golden Globe-nominated Broadway, television, and film actor (Chess, Shogun: The Musical, North and South, Sinatra)
 Lynn Chen (1998) – actress, Saving Face William Christopher (1954) – actor, Father John Patrick Francis Mulcahy, M*A*S*H Jem Cohen (1984) – Independent Spirit Award, feature filmmaker and video artist
 Sarah Elmaleh (2007) - voice actor
 Toby Emmerich – producer, film executive, screenwriter; head, New Line Cinema (as of 2008)
 Halley Feiffer (2007) – actress, playwright
 Beanie Feldstein (2015) – actress
 Jo Firestone (2009) actress and comedian
 Sam Fleischner (2006) – filmmaker
 Bradley Fuller – producer, co-owner of Platinum Dunes
 Bobbito García (1988) – hip hop DJ, writer
 William "Willie" Garson – actor, White Collar; most known for his portrayal of Stanford on Sex and the City Max Goldblatt (2005) – actor, writer, director
 Matthew Greenfield – Independent Spirit John Cassavetes Award, producer of independent films
 Adam Hann-Byrd (2004) – actor, Little Man Tate, The Ice Storm, Jumanji Elisabeth Harnois (2001) – actress, Young Artist Award (1993); Adventures in Wonderland, Pretty Persuasion Jack Johnson (2009) – actor, best known for performance in Lost in Space Warren Keith – stage and film actor, director
 Chrishaunda Lee – television host, actress
 Jieho Lee (1995) – filmmaker
 Tembi Locke – actress, has appeared on more than 40 television shows
 Lauren LoGiudice – actress and writer
 Monica Louwerens (1995) – actress, beauty queen from Canada, competed in 1996 Miss America Pageant
 Barton MacLane – actor, playwright, screenwriter; appeared in many classic films from the 1930s through the 1960s
 Lin-Manuel Miranda (2002)-Tony-Award-winning Broadway actor, librettist, and composer
 Becky Mode – playwright, actress, television producer
 William R. Moses (attended) – television and film actor
 Julius Onah – filmmaker of Nigerian descent
 Amanda Palmer (1998) – director Hotel Blanc (2002); playwright, actress, The Onion Cellar (2006); producer, actress in ART's Cabaret (2010)
 Benjamin Parrillo (1992) – actor, Cold Case, 24, NCIS, Boston Legal Leszek Pawlowicz (1979) – Ultimate Tournament of Champions, 2005; won Jeopardy! Tournament of Champions, 1992; won Ben Stein's Money, 1999
 Zak Penn (1990) – screenwriter (Fantastic Four, X-Men: The Last Stand, PCU, The Incredible Hulk); director (Incident at Loch Ness, The Grand); co-creator, Alphas John Rothman (1971) – film, stage, and television actor
 Stefan Schaefer (1994) – director, screenwriter, producer, independent films; Confess and Arranged; Fulbright Scholar
 Sarah Schaub (2006) – two Young Artist Awards, actress (Promised Land)
 Paul Schiff (1981) – film producer (My Cousin Vinny, Rushmore, Mona Lisa Smile, Solitary Man)
 Lawrence Sher (1992) – cinematographer and producer, The Dukes of Hazzard, Garden State Wendy Spero – actress, comedian, writer
 Kim Stolz (2005) – America's Next Top Model Cycle 5 finalist
 Stephen Talbot (1970) – former TV child actor of the 1950s, 1960s; portrayed Gilbert Bates on Leave it to Beaver Kim Wayans – actress; member of the Wayans family
 Henry Willson – Hollywood talent agent; clients included Rock Hudson, Tab Hunter, Robert Wagner, Clint Walker; discovered Lana Turner; a large role in popularizing the beefcake craze of the 1950s
 Scott Wiper (1992) – director, screenwriter, actor
 Angela Yee (1997) – radio personality
 Alexander Yellen (2003) – cinematographer

Law
Non-U.S. government judicial figures
 George Edwin King (B.A. 1859, M.A. 1861) – 10th Puisne Justice, Supreme Court of Canada (1893–01); Attorney General of New Brunswick (1870–78); Premier of New Brunswick (1870-1871 & 1872-1878); Supreme Court of New Brunswick (1880–93)

Supreme Court of the United States
 David Josiah Brewer (1851–54) – 51st Associate Justice of the U.S. Supreme Court (1890–1910); major contributor to doctrine of substantive due process and to minority rights; U.S. Court of Appeals for the Eighth Circuit (1884–90); U.S. District Court for the District of Kansas (1865–69); Kansas Supreme Court (1870–1884)

U.S. Federal appellate and trial courts

 Frank R. Alley, III – judge, United States Bankruptcy Court, District of Oregon (as of 2011).
 John Baker (A.M. 1879) – judge, United States District Court for the District of Indiana
 John D. Bates (1968) – judge, United States District Court for the District of Columbia (2001–); judge, United States Foreign Intelligence Surveillance Court (2006–)
 Edward G. Biester, Jr. (1952) – judge, United States Court of Military Commission Review (2004–07); Attorney General for Commonwealth of Pennsylvania (1979–80)
 Denise Jefferson Casper (B.A. 1990) – judge, U.S. District Court for the District of Massachusetts (2010–); 1st black, female judge to serve on federal bench in Massachusetts
 Alonzo J. Edgerton (1850) – judge, United States District Court for the District of South Dakota (1889–96); Chief Justice of Supreme Court of Dakota Territory
 Katherine B. Forrest (1986) – judge, United States District Court for the Southern District of New York (2011–)
 Frederick E. Fuller – federal judge for interior Alaska; appointed in 1912; early champion for the credibility of Alaska natives as witnesses in federal court
 Steven Gold (1977) – chief United States magistrate judge, United States District Court for the Eastern District of New York (1993–)
 Terry J. Hatter (1954) – judge, United States District Court for the Central District of California, Los Angeles (as of 2011); chief judge, 1998; senior status, 2005
 Andrew Kleinfeld (1966) – judge, United States Court of Appeals for the Ninth Circuit (1991–); judge, United States District Court for the District of Alaska (1986–91)
 Martin A. Knapp (1868) – judge, United States Court of Appeals for the Fourth Circuit (1916–23); judge, United States Court of Appeals for the Second Circuit (1910–16); judge, United States Commerce Court (1910–13)
 Mark R. Kravitz (1972) – judge, United States District Court for the District of Connecticut (2003–2012)
 Arthur MacArthur Sr. – judge, predecessor, United States District Court for the District of Columbia (1870–87)
 James Rogers Miller Jr. (1953) – judge, United States District Court for the District of Maryland (1970–86)
 Patricia Head Minaldi (1980) – judge, United States District Court for the Western District of Louisiana (2003–2018)
 J. Frederick Motz (1964) – judge, United States District Court for the District of Maryland (1985–), chief judge (1994–01); United States Attorney for the District of Maryland
 Michael S. Nachmanoff, Judge of the United States District Court for the Eastern District of Virginia (2021–present), Magistrate Judge of the United States District Court for the Eastern District of Virginia (2015-2021)
 John Wesley North – judge, by Presidential appointment, predecessor, United States District Court for the District of Nevada; founder, Northfield, Minnesota and Riverside, California
 Lyle L. Richmond (1952) – associate justice, High Court of American Samoa (in American Samoa, the highest appellate court below U.S. Supreme Court) (1991–); attorney general, American Samoa.
 Rachel A. Ruane (1997) – judge, United States Los Angeles Immigration Court (2010–)
 Anthony Scirica (1962) – chief judge, United States Court of Appeals for the Third Circuit (Philadelphia) (1987–); judge, United States District Court for the Eastern District of Pennsylvania (1984–87)
 Dominic J. Squatrito (1961) – judge, United States District Court for the District of Connecticut (1994–2021); Fulbright scholar
 Stephen S. Trott (1962) – judge, U.S. Court of Appeals for the Ninth Circuit (1988–); United States Attorney for the Central District of California
 Ronald M. Whyte (mathematics 1964) – judge, United States District Court for the Northern District of California (1992–)
 John Simson Woolson (A.B. 1860, A.M. 1863) – judge, United States District Court for the District of Iowa

U.S. State courts

 Raymond E. Baldwin –  Chief Justice (1959–63), associate justice (1949–59), Connecticut Supreme Court
 Richard C. Bosson (1966) – Chief Justice (2002–06), associate justice (2002–), New Mexico Supreme Court; chief judge, New Mexico Court of Appeals (01–02)
 John Moore Currey – eighth Chief Justice (1866–68), associate justice (1864–66), Supreme Court of California
 Charles Douglas III (1960–62) – associate justice, New Hampshire Supreme Court (1977–85)
 Miles T. Granger (1842) – associate justice, Connecticut Supreme Court
 Ernest A. Inglis (1908) – Chief Justice (1853–57), associate justice (1850–53), Connecticut Supreme Court (1950–57)
 Fred C. Norton (1950) – associate judge, Minnesota Court of Appeals
 James McMillan Shafter – judge, California Superior Court and state legislator in California, Vermont, and Wisconsin
 Oscar L. Shafter (1834) – associate justice, Supreme Court of California (1864–1867)
 David M. Shea (1944) – associate justice, Connecticut Supreme Court (1981–1992)
 David K. Thomson, Associate Justice of the New Mexico Supreme Court (2019–present)
 Arthur T. Vanderbilt – Chief Justice, New Jersey Supreme Court; twice declined nomination, United States Supreme Court
 Josiah O. Wolcott – Chancellor, Delaware Court of Chancery; Attorney General of Delaware

Government and other lawyers

 Gerald L. Baliles (1963) – Attorney General of Virginia (1982–1985) and Governor of Virginia (1986-1990).
 Tristram Coffin (1985) – U.S. Attorney for the District of Vermont (2009–2015)
 George C. Conway (1923) – Connecticut Attorney General (1951–1953)
 Edmund Pearson Dole (1874) – first Attorney General of Hawaii, Territory of Hawaii
 Brian E. Frosh (1968) – Attorney General of Maryland (2015-present) Maryland State Senator (1995-2015); Maryland House of Delegates (1987–1995)
 Theodore E. Hancock (1871) – New York State Attorney General (1894–1898)
 Rusty Hardin (1965) – trial attorney, efforts resulted in U.S. Supreme Court unanimously overturning Arthur Andersen's conviction of obstruction of justice
 Eddie Jordan (1974) – United States Attorney for the Eastern District of Louisiana (1994–2001); District Attorney of Orléans Parish (2003–2007)
 Edward J. C. Kewen (1843) – first Attorney General of California; also Los Angeles County District Attorney (1859–1861)
 Theodore I. Koskoff (1913–89) A.B. – trial lawyer
 John Gage Marvin (1815–55) A.B. – lawyer; legal bibliographer (Marvin's Legal Bibliography, or A thesaurus of American, English, Irish, and Scotch law books); figure in history of California; first California State Superintendent of Public Instruction
 Charles Phelps (B.A. 1875, M.A.) – first Connecticut Attorney General (1899–1903); Secretary of the State of Connecticut (1897–1899)
 Michele A. Roberts (1977) – trial lawyer; named "one of Washington's 100 Most Powerful Women"; partner, Skadden, Arps (2011–)
 Abner W. Sibal (1943) – General Counsel, United States Equal Employment Opportunity Commission (EEOC) (1975–1978)

Legal academia

 Gabriel J. Chin (1985) – UC Davis School of Law (2011–); "Most Cited Law Professors by Specialty, 00–07", "50 Most Cited Law Profs Who entered Teaching Since 92"
 Hiram Chodosh (1985) – dean, S.J. Quinney College of Law (2006–)
 Ward Farnsworth (1989) – dean, University of Texas School of Law at Austin (2012–); former law clerk, Anthony Kennedy, Associate Justice, U.S. Supreme Court
 Shad Saleem Faruqi (B.A., age 19) – Professor of Law, Universiti Teknologi MARA (1971–); constitutional consultant to Maldives, Fiji, Timor Leste, Afghanistan, Iraq
 Stephen C. Ferruolo (CSS 1971) – dean, University of San Diego School of Law (2011–); Rhodes Scholar; former faculty, Stanford University
 John C.P. Goldberg (CSS 1983) – Eli Goldston Professorship, Harvard Law School (2008–); former law clerk, Byron White, Associate Justice, U.S. Supreme Court; expert in tort law and theory, political theory, jurisprudence
 Robert J. Harris – attorney and professor, University of Michigan Law School (1959–1974; adjunct faculty member, 1974–2005); Rhodes Scholar
 Naomi Mezey (1987) – professor, Georgetown University Law Center (civil procedure, legislation, nationalism and cultural identity) (1997–); Watson Fellow
 William Callyhan Robinson (1850–1852) – academician, jurist; professor, Yale Law (1869–95); dean, Columbus School of Law (1898–1911)
 Theodore Shaw (1979) – professor, Columbia Law (2011–); 5th President and Director-Counsel, NAACP Legal Defense and Educational Fund (2004–08)
 Raymond L. Solomon (1968) – dean, Rutgers Law School-Camden (since 1998); professor, University of Chicago Law School, Northwestern University Law School
 Barbara A. Spellman (1979) – professor, University of Virginia Law School (2008–); professor of psychology, University of Virginia (since 2007); editor-in-chief of Perspectives on Psychological Science Arthur T. Vanderbilt (1910) – dean, New York University Law School (1943–48); professor, NYU Law (1914–43)
 Charles Alan Wright (1947) – long-time professor, University of Texas School of Law at Austin; was foremost authority in U.S. on constitutional law and federal procedure

Literature

 Becky Albertalli (2004) – writer, Simon vs. the Homo Sapiens Agenda and other best-selling works
 Steve Almond (1988) – writer, The Best American Short Stories 2010
 Stephen Alter – author
 Suzanne Berne – novelist, winner of Great Britain's prestigious Orange Prize; professor of English
 Kate Bernheimer – author, scholar, editor
 Nicholas Birns (1987, attended but did not graduate); literary critic and editor.   
 Peter Blauner – novelist; Edgar Award, The New York Times Best Seller list,
 Amy Bloom (1975) – author, Away (The New York Times Best Seller list, 2007); National Magazine Award, The Best American Short Stories, O. Henry Prize Stories
 John Briggs (1968) – author, scholar, editor
 Andrew Bridge – author, Hope's Boy, New York Times Bestseller, Washington Post Best Book of the Year
 Ethan Bronner – his novel Battle for Justice was selected by New York Public Library as one of the "Best Books of 1989"
 Alexander Chee – writer, 2003 Whiting Writers' Award; former Visiting Writer at Amherst College
 James Wm. Chichetto – poet, novelist, critic, lecturer, Catholic priest
 Mei Chin – fiction writer, food critic
 Kate Colby (1996) – poet, editor, Norma Farber First Book Award
 Robin Cook, MD (1962) – medical mystery writer; books have appeared on The New York Times Best Seller list, including Coma, Critical, Outbreak, and 29 others
 Michelle Regalado Deatrick – author, poet
 Anna Dewdney (1987) – children’s author and illustrator 
 Paul Dickson (1961) – writer, American English language and popular culture
 Melvin Dixon (1971) – author, poet, translator
 Beverly Donofrio (1978) – author, Riding in Cars with Boys Steve Englehart (1969) – comic book writer
 Edward B. Fiske (1959) – educational writer; creator of The Fiske Guide to Colleges; former education editor for The New York Times Laura Jane Fraser (1982) – journalist, essayist, memoirist, and travel writer
 Glen David Gold (1966) – author of Carter Beats the Devil, Sunnyside Amanda Davis (1993) – writer; author of "Wonder When You'll Miss Me"
 Elizabeth Graver (1986) – writer; Drue Heinz Literature Prize, O. Henry Award, Pushcart Prize (2001), Best American Essays, Cohen Awards
 Daniel Handler (1992) – author (under the pseudonym Lemony Snicket) of A Series of Unfortunate Events (children's book series)
 Rust Hills (B.A. 1948, M.A. 1949) – author and fiction editor
 Adina Hoffman (B.A. 1989) – essayist, critic, literary biographer; 2013 Windham–Campbell Literature Prize; 2010 Wingate Prize
 Albert Harrison Hoyt (1850) – editor and author
 Christianne Meneses Jacobs – writer, editor, and teacher
 Kaylie Jones – novelist
 Sebastian Junger (1984) – author of The Perfect Storm, War; DuPont-Columbia Award; Time magazine Top Ten Non-fiction Books of 2010; National Magazine Award
 James Kaplan – novelist, biographer, journalist; 1999 The New York Times Notable Book of the Year; NYT Top 10 Books of 2010; Best American Short Stories Pagan Kennedy (1984) – author, short listed for Orange Prize; pioneer of the 1990s Zine Movement
 Brad Kessler (1986) – novelist, Whiting Writers' Award (fiction, 2007), Dayton Literary Peace Prize; 2008 Rome Prize
Gerard Koeppel (1979) - writer, historian
 Christopher Krovatin (2007) – author, musician
 Alisa Kwitney – novelist, Destiny: A Chronicle of Deaths Foretold Brett Laidlaw (1983) – author, Trout Caviar and Blue Bel Air Seth Lerer (1976) –medievalist and literary critic;  2009 National Book Critics Circle Award (for criticism); 2010 Truman Capote Award for Literary Criticism
 Ariel Levy – author of Female Chauvinist Pigs, anthologized in The Best American Essays of 2008 and New York Stories James Lord – author, including biographies of Alberto Giacometti and Pablo Picasso
 Robert Ludlum (1951) – The Bourne Identity, The Osterman Weekend, The Holcroft Covenant, 24 others; 9 of his books have made The New York Times Best Seller list; 290–500 million copies of his books in print
 Joanie Mackowski – 2009, 2007 Best American Poetry, 2008 Writer Magazine/Emily Dickinson Award, 2003 Kate Tufts Discovery Award
 John Buffalo Mailer – author, playwright, and journalist
 William J. Mann (M.A.) – novelist, biographer; Kate: The Woman Who Was Hepburn, named one of the 100 Notable Books of 2006 by The New York Times Lew McCreary – editor, author, Senior Editor of the Harvard Business Review
 Jack McDevitt – science fiction author; 2006 Nebula Award for Best Novel (fifteen-time nominee), 2004 Campbell Award
 Leslie McGrath (M.A.) – poet
 John P. McKay (1961) – author, Herbert Baxter Adams Prize, professor of history
 Scott Mebus – novelist, playwright, composer
 Melody Moezzi (2001) – author of War on Error: Real Stories of American Muslims Gorham Munson (1917) – literary critic
 Blake Nelson (1984) – author; Grinzane Cavour Prize; novels Girl, Paranoid Park Charles Olson (B.A. 1932, M.A.) – modernist poet, crucial link between such poets as Ezra Pound and the New American poets, one of thinkers who coined the term postmodernism
 Michael Palmer, MD (1964) – medical mystery writer, Side Effects,  Extreme Measures; all of his 16 books have made The New York Times Best Seller list
 Carolyn Parkhurst (1992) – author of The Dogs of Babel (a New York Times Notable Book) and Lost and Found (both on the New York Times Bestseller List)
 Peter Pezzelli – author, including Francesca's Kitchen, Italian Lessons Daniel Pinchbeck – author
 Jason Pinter – novelist and thriller writer 
 Craig Pospisil – playwright
 Michael Prescott (1981) – crime writer, many of whose novels have appeared on The New York Times Best Seller list
 Kevin Prufer (1992) – poet, essayist, editor; winner of four Pushcart Prizes, Best American Poetry 2003, 2010
 Delphine Red Shirt (MALS) – Oglala Lakota writer, adjunct professor at Yale University and Connecticut College
 Spencer Reece – writer and poet, 2009 Pushcart Prize, 2005 Whiting Writers' Award for poetry
 Jean Rikhoff – writer and editor
 Mary Roach – New York Times Best Selling author; New York Times Notable Books pick (2005); New York Times Book Review Editor's Choice (2008)
 Carlo Rotella (1986) – writer, Whiting Writers' Award (nonfiction, 2007), L. L. Winship/PEN New England Award
 Ruth L. Schwartz – poet
 Sadia Shepard – author, Fulbright Scholar (2001)
 Joyce Sidman (B.A. German) – children's writer; 2011 Newbery Honor Award
 Maya Sonenberg (1982) – short story writer, 1989 Drue Heinz Literature Prize
 Tristan Taormino (1993) – author and sex educator
 Jonathan Thirkield – poet, 2008 Walt Whitman Award
 Wells Tower (1996) – writer, two Pushcart Prizes, Best American Short Stories 2010
 Ayelet Waldman (1986) – author of Love and Other Impossible Pursuits, Daughter's Keeper, and the Mommy-Track Mysteries
 David Rains Wallace – author of The Monkey's Bridge (a 1997 New York Times Notable Book) and The Klamath Knot (1984 John Burroughs Medal)
 Austin Warren (1929) – literary critic, author, and professor of English
 Sam Wasson (2003) – author, film historian, publisher
 D.B. Weiss – author and screenwriter
 Michael Wolfe – author, poet
 Paul Yoon (2002) – writer; 2009 John C. Zacharis First Book Award; O. Henry Award; Best American Short Stories 2006
 Lizabeth Zindel – author, working primarily in the young adult (teen) genre

Medicine

 Malcolm Bagshaw, MD (B.A. 1946) – 1996 Kettering Prize; "one of the world's foremost experts in radiation therapy"
 Andrea Barthwell, MD (B.A.) – named one of "Best Doctors in America" in 1997; Betty Ford Award in 2003
 Herbert Benson, MD (1957) – cardiologist; founding president, Mind-Body Medical Institute; professor, Harvard Medical School (as of 2012)
 John Benson, Jr., MD (B.A.) – fellow, Institute of Medicine, National Academy of Sciences (1991); IOM named Fellowship in his honor ('10); Abraham Flexner Award ('10)
 Charles Brenner (B.A. 1983) – professor, head of biochemistry, University of Iowa (as of 2012); leader, fields of tumor suppressor gene function and metabolism
 Thomas Broker (B.A. 1966) – expert, human papilloma viruses; professor, University of Alabama at Birmingham (as of 2012); played central role, discovery of RNA splicing
 William H. Dietz, MD (B.A. 1996) – Director, Division of Centers for Disease Control and Prevention (1997–); fellow, Institute of Medicine, National Academy of Sciences
 Joseph Fins, MD (B.A. 1982) – chief, Division of Medical Ethics, Weill Cornell Medical College (as of 2012); fellow, Institute of Medicine, National Academy of Sciences
 Michael Fossel, MD (B.A., M.A.) – professor, clinical medicine (as of 2012), known for his views on telomerase therapy
 Laman Gray, Jr., MD (1963) – cardiologist; leader, field of cardiovascular surgery; redesigned, implanted world's 1st self-contained AbioCor artificial heart
 Scott Gottlieb, MD (1994) – Commissioner of Foods and Drugs (2017-2019), Food and Drug Administration, United States Department of Health and Human Services
 Michael E. Greenberg (B.A. 1976) – neuroscientist; National Academy of Sciences; chair, neurobiology, Harvard Medical School (as of 2012)
 Allan Hobson, MD (B.A. 1955) – psychiatrist, dream researcher; professor, psychiatry, Emeritus, Harvard Medical School (as of 2012)
 Alex L. Kolodkin (B.A. 1980) – neuroscientist; professor, Johns Hopkins School of Medicine; Howard Hughes Medical Institute Investigator (2005–) 
 Jay A. Levy, MD (B.A. 1960) – co-discoverer, AIDS virus (1983); professor, Department of Medicine, University of California, San Francisco (as of 2012); editor-in-chief, AIDS journal
 Joseph L. Melnick (B.A.) – epidemiologist, known as "a founder of modern virology"; Albert B. Sabin Gold Medal
Anne L. Peters, MD (B.A. 1979) –  physician, diabetes expert, and professor of clinical medicine at the Keck School of Medicine of USC
 Ralph Pomeroy, MD (B.A.) – gynecologist, famous for creation of "Pomeroy" tubal ligation; co-founder, the Williamsburg Hospital in Brooklyn, New York
 David J. Sencer, MD (B.A. 1946) – Director, United States Centers for Disease Control and Prevention (1966–77); Head, New York City Department of Health ('81–85)
 Theodore Shapiro, MD (B.A. 1936) – psychiatrist
 Harry Tiebout, MD (B.A. 1917) – psychiatrist, promoted Alcoholics Anonymous approach to patients, fellow professionals, and the public
 Peter Tontonoz, MD (B.A. 1989) – professor of pathology, David Geffen School of Medicine at UCLA; Howard Hughes Medical Institute Investigator (2000–)Profile of Peter Tontonoz, American Society for Clinical Investigation. Retrieved December 23, 2012.

Military

 Brigadier General Allen Fraser Clark, Jr. (1910–90) (B.A.) – United States Army (in the 1960s)
 Admiral Thomas H. Collins (four-star rank) (M.A.) – Retired 22nd Commandant, United States Coast Guard (2002–08) (guided Coast Guard after 9/11)
 Major General Myron C. Cramer (two-star rank) (B.A. 1904) – 20th Judge Advocate General of the United States Army (1941–45); judge, The International Military Tribunal for the Far East, Tokyo, Japan (1946–49)
 Rear Admiral Marshall E. Cusic Jr. MD (two-star rank) (B.A. 1965) – Medical Corps U.S. Naval Reserve; Chief, Medical Reserve Corps, Bureau of Medicine and Surgery
 Brigadier General Alonzo Jay Edgerton (B.A. 1850) – American Civil War, Union Army, 67th Regiment Infantry U.S. Colored Troops (Bvt. March 13, 1865)
 Lieutenant General William H. Ginn Jr. (three-star rank) (1946–48) – United States Air Force; Commander, U.S. Forces Japan and U.S. Fifth Air Force
 Brigadier General John E. Hutton MD (B.A. 1953) – U.S. Army; Director, White House Medical Unit; Physician to President Ronald Reagan
 Brigadier General Levin Major Lewis (class of 1852) – Confederate States Army, American Civil War; assigned to duty as Brig. General; president of several colleges
 Admiral James Loy (four-star rank) (M.A.) – Retired 21st Commandant, U.S. Coast Guard (1998–2002); Acting United States Secretary of Homeland Security (2005)
 Brigadier General Robert Shuter Macrum (B.A. 1927) – U.S. Air Force
 Brigadier General Samuel Mather Mansfield (1858–60, B.A. 1911) – U.S. Army; engineer
 Rear Admiral (Ret.) Dr. Richard W. Schneider (two-star rank) (M.A. 1973) – U.S. Coast Guard; significant role in the transformation of the Coast Guard
 Lieutenant General Adolph G. Schwenk (three-star rank) (B.A. 1963) – United States Marine Corps; Commanding Gen., U.S.FMF (Atl.) and U.S. FMF (Eur.)
 Rear Admiral (Ret.) R. Dennis Sirois (two-star rank) (M.A. physics) – U.S. Coast Guard; Assistant Commander for Operations
 Rear Admiral (Ret.) Patrick M. Stillman (two-star rank) (M.A.) – U.S. Coast Guard, founding father of the Integrated Deepwater System Program
 Tuskegee Airman Chuck Stone (B.A. 1948) – Congressional Gold Medal (March 29, 2007); United States Army Air Forces
 Brigadier General John B. Van Petten (B.A. 1850, M.A. '53) – Union Army; his Civil War reminiscences became basis for The Red Badge of CourageBurton, Rick (Summer 2012).  "Syracuse and a Civil War Masterpiece". Syracuse University Magazine. Subsection: "Oakwood Cemetery Connection". Vol. 29, No. 2. Retrieved September 20, 2012.

Music

 Adolovni Acosta – graduate student; classical and concert pianist
 Bill Anschell (1982) – pianist, composer; recorded with Lionel Hampton, Ron Carter
 John Perry Barlow (1969) – lyricist for the Grateful Dead
 Robert Becker – composer and percussionist
 Paul Berliner (PhD) – professor of music, Duke University
 Marion Brown (M.A. ethnomusicology) – alto saxophonist, composer
 Darius Brubeck (1969) – pianist, composer, band leader, professor of music
 Kit Clayton – musician and programmer
 Tim Cohen (B.A.) – San Francisco-based musician and visual artist
 Bill Cole (PhD) – musician; professor of music, Dartmouth College, Amherst College, professor of African-American Studies, Syracuse University
 Nicolas Collins (B.A., M.A.) – composer, mostly electronic music; Watson Fellow
 Amy Crawford (B.A. 2005) – songwriter, vocalist, keyboardist and producer
 Douglas J. Cuomo (attended) – composer
 Nathan Davis (PhD) – musician; professor of music, University of Pittsburgh
 Stanton Davis (M.A.) – trumpeter, educator
 Santi Debriano (M.A.) – double bassist, bandleader
 Frank Denyer (PhD) – professor of composition, Dartington College of Arts, South West England
 Khalif "Le1f" Diouf (2011) – musician; rapper
 Arnold Dreyblatt (M.A. 1982) – composer, based in Berlin, Germany; elected to German Academy of Art
 Judy Dunaway (M.A.) – avant-garde composer; creator, sound installations
 S. A. K. Durga (PhD) – musicologist, ethnomusicologist, professor of music
 Tim Eriksen (M.A. 1993, PhD) – multi-instrumentalist; musicologist; performer, consultant for soundtrack of film Cold Mountain James Fei (M.A. 1999) – composer and performer, contemporary classical music
 Dave Fisher (1962) – lead singer, arranger, The Highwaymen; composer
 William Galison –  multi-instrumentalist, most famous as harmonica player, composer
 Kiff Gallagher (1991) – musician, songwriter, helped create AmeriCorps
 Alexis Gideon – composer, multi-media artist
 Ben Goldwasser – founding member of Grammy Award-nominated MGMT
 Adam Goren (1996) – sole member of synth-punk band Atom and His Package
 Mary Halvorson (2002) – guitarist
 Jon B. Higgins (B.A., M.A., PhD) – musician; scholar, Carnatic music
 Jay Hoggard (1976) – current faculty, Wesleyan; vibraphonist; recorded often
 Ashenafi Kebede (1969 M.A., 1971 PhD) –  Ethiopian ethnomusicologist
 Ron Kuivila (1977) – current faculty, Wesleyan; co-creator, software language Formula
 Steve Lehman (2000 B.A.; 2002 M.A.) – composer, saxophonist; Fulbright scholar
 David Leisner – classical guitarist, composer; teacher, Manhattan School of Music
 Charlie Looker (2003) – musician
 MC Frontalot (Damian Hess) (1996) – rapper; innovator of phrase nerdcore
 Mladen Milicevic (M.A. 1988) – composer, experimental music, film music
 Justin Moyer (1998) – musician and journalist
 Dennis Murphy (PhD) – composer, one of the fathers of the American gamelan
 Hankus Netsky (PhD) – Klezmer musician, composer
 Amanda Palmer (1998) – composer/singer/pianist, The Dresden Dolls
 Hewitt Pantaleoni (PhD) – 20th-century ethnomusicologist; known for work in African music
 Sriram Parasuram (PhD) – Hindustani classical vocalist; also a violinist
 Brandon Patton (1995) – songwriter, bassplayer
 Andrew Pergiovanni (B.A.) – composer of "modern classical" and "popular" idioms
 Chris Pureka – singer-songwriter
 John Rapson (PhD) – jazz trombonist and music educator
 Gregory Rogove (2002) – songwriter, indie-music drummer
 Steve Roslonek – children's music performer and composer
 Santigold (Santi White) – electropop/hip-hop artist
 Sarah Kirkland Snider – composer of instrumental music and art songs; co-founder, co-director, New Amsterdam Records
 Tyshawn Sorey – musician and composer
 Anuradha Sriram (M.A.) – Indian carnatic singer; also, as playback singer, in more than 90 Tamil, Telugu, Malayalam, Kannada, and Hindi films
 Carl Sturken (1978 B.A.) – musician, Rhythm Syndicate; songwriter and record producer with Evan Rogers, Syndicated Rhythm Productions
 Sumarsam (1976 M.A.) – current faculty, Wesleyan; Javanese musician; virtuoso and scholar of Gamelan
 Himanshu Suri (2007 B.A.) – rapper; writer; alternative hip hop group Das Racist
 Tierney Sutton (1986) – thrice Grammy Award nominated jazz singer; Jazzweek 2005 Vocalist of the Year
 Laxmi Ganesh Tewari (PhD) – Hindustani virtuoso vocalist, professor of music
 Stephen Trask (1989) – composer (stage, screen); Obie Award; Grammy nomination
 Stephen S. Trott (1962) – early member, The Highwaymen, which originated at Wesleyan; #1 single ("Michael Row the Boat Ashore" 1961)
 Andrew VanWyngarden – founding member of Grammy Award nominated MGMT
 Victor Vazquez (2006) – musician; rapper; alternative hip hop group Das Racist
 T. Viswanathan (1975 PhD) – Carnatic flute virtuoso, professor of music
 Dennis Waring (1982 PhD) – ethnomusicologist and Estay Organ historian
 Dar Williams (1989) – folksinger
 Daniel James Wolf (M.A., PhD) – composer of modern classical music
 Peter Zummo (1970, B.A.; 1975, M.A., PhD) –  composer, musician (postminimalist)

 Karaikudi S. Subramanian – (1985, M.A., PhD) – musician; educationist, Carnatic music

News

 Eric Asimov (1979) – restaurant columnist, editor, The New York Times (nephew of Isaac Asimov)
 Doug Berman (1984) – Peabody Award-winning producer, launched NPR's Car Talk; creator, other news radio shows 
 Robert A. Bertsche –  two-time winner, National Magazine Award; journalist, editor, media lawyer;
 William Blakemore (1965) – correspondent, ABC News, DuPont-Columbia Award
 Dominique Browning (1977) – former editor-in-chief, House & Garden Katy Butler (1971) – journalist, Best American Essays, Best American Science Writing, finalist for 2004 National Magazine Award
 Marysol Castro (1996) – weather forecaster, CBS The Early Show (2011); weather anchor, contributing writer, ABC Good Morning America Weekend Edition (2004–10)
 Jonathan Dube – pioneer, online journalism; print journalist  
 E.V. Durling – nationally syndicated newspaper columnist and one of the first Hollywood reporters
 Jane Eisner (1977) – editor, The Forward, paper's first female editor; former editor, reporter, columnist, The Philadelphia Inquirer Smokey Fontaine (1993) – editor-in-chief, writer, music critic, Giant (2006–); Chief Content Officer, Interactive One (2007–)
 Steven Greenhouse (1973) – reporter, The New York Times; 2010 New York Press Club Awards For Journalism; 2009 Hillman Prize
 Ferris Greenslet (1897) – editor, writer; associate editor, Atlantic Monthly; director, literary adviser, Houghton Mifflin Co.
 Vanessa Grigoriadis (1995) – National Magazine Award; writer
 Peter Gutmann (1971) – journalist, attorney
 William Henry Huntington – journalist
 Alberto Ibargüen (1966) – CEO, John S. and James L. Knight Foundation; former publisher, The Miami Herald David Karp – pomologist, culinary journalist
 Alex Kotlowitz (1977) – George Polk Award; Peabody Award, There Are No Children Here: The Story of Two Boys Growing Up in the Other America Jake Lahut (2017) — campaign reporter, The Daily Beast
 Dave Lindorff (1972) – Project Censored Award (2004); investigative reporter, columnist
 Stephen Metcalf – critic-at-large and columnist, Slate magazine
 Kyrie O'Connor (1976) – journalist, writer, editor
 Gail O'Neill – television journalist; former elite African-American fashion model
 Charles Bennett Ray – journalist; owner, editor, The Colored American, first black student at Wesleyan in 1832
 Jake Silverstein – 4th editor-in-chief (2008–), Texas Monthly, ten-time winner, National Magazine Award; 2007 Pen/Journalism Award; Fulbright Scholar;
 Chuck Stone (1948) – journalist; professor of journalism, University of North Carolina; former editor, Philadelphia Daily News Vin Suprynowicz (1972) – libertarian columnist
 Laura Ruth Walker (1979) – 2008 Edward R. Murrow Award; Peabody Award
 Ulrich Wickert (Fulbright Scholar at Wesleyan in 1962) – broadcast journalist in Germany
 Michael Yamashita (1971) – award-winning photographer, photojournalist, National Geographic John Yang (1980) – Peabody Award-winning journalist; two-time winner, DuPont-Columbia Award; NBC News correspondent, commentator (2007–)

Politics and government

Religion

 Edward Gayer Andrews (BA 1847) – president, Cazenovia Seminary; later bishop, Methodist Episcopal Church
 Osman Cleander Baker (1830–33) – bishop, Methodist Episcopal Church; biblical scholar; namesake of Baker University, Baldwin City, Kansas
 Lawrence Aloysius Burke (MALS 1970) – 4th archbishop, Roman Catholic Archdiocese of Kingston in Jamaica; 1st archbishop, Roman Catholic Archdiocese of Nassau
 James Wm. Chichetto – Catholic priest, Congregation of Holy Cross, poet, critic
 Davis Wasgatt Clark (1836) – 1st president, Freedman's Aid Society; predecessor, namesake of Clark Atlanta University, Atlanta, Georgia; bishop, Methodist Episcopal Church
 Shira Koch Epstein (1998) – rabbi, Congregation Beth Elohim, Brooklyn, New York
 James Midwinter Freeman – clergyman, writer
 William Henry Giler – founder of a seminary and a college; chaplain during the American Civil War
 Debra W. Haffner (1985) – Unitarian Universalist minister; director, The Religious Institute on Sexual Morality, Justice, and Healing
 Gilbert Haven (1846) – 2nd president, Freedman's Aid Society; early proponent of equality of the sexes; bishop, Methodist Episcopal Church
 Robert T. Hoshibata (1973) – Hawaiian bishop, United Methodist Church
 Jesse Lyman Hurlbut (1864) – clergyman, author
 John Christian Keener (1835) – bishop, Methodist Episcopal Church
 Daniel Parish Kidder (1836) – theologian, missionary to Brazil
 Isaac J. Lansing (B.A. 1872, M.A. 1875) – Methodist Episcopal minister of Park Street Church; college president, author
 Delmar R. Lowell (1873) – minister, American Civil War veteran, historian, genealogist
 Willard Francis Mallalieu – bishop, Methodist Episcopal Church
 James Mudge (1865) – clergyman, author, missionary to India
 Thomas H. Mudge (1840) – clergyman
 Zachariah Atwell Mudge (1813–88) – pastor, author
 Frederick Buckley Newell (AB 1913) – bishop, The Methodist Church (elected 1952)
 William Xavier Ninde (A.B. 1855, D.D. 1874) – bishop, Methodist Episcopal Church (now the United Methodist Church); president, Garrett–Evangelical Theological Seminary, Evanston, Illinois
 Spencer Reece (1985) – Episcopal priest; chaplain to the Bishop of Spain for the Spanish Reformed Episcopal Church (Iglesia Española Reformada Episcopal)
 Charles Francis Rice (B.A. 1872, M.A. 1875, D.D. 1893) – Methodist minister
 William Rice (M.A. 1853, D.D. 1876) – Methodist Minister and librarian
 Matthew Richey (M.A. 1836, D.D. 1847) – Canadian minister, educator, and leader in Nova Scotia, Canada
 B. T. Roberts (university honors) – co-founder, Free Methodist Church of North America
 A. James Rudin (1955) – rabbi, Senior Interreligious Adviser, The American Jewish Committee
 James Strong (A.B. 1844, D.D. 1856, LL.D 1881) – creator of Strong's Exhaustive Concordance of the Bible (1890); acting president Troy University, Troy, New York; mayor
Conrad Tillard (born 1964) - politician, Baptist minister, radio host, author, and civil rights activist
 Moses Clark White (1845) – pioneering missionary in China and physician; first linguistic study of Fuzhou dialect

Royalty

 Prince Carlos, Prince of Piacenza, Duke of Parma (B.A. government) – Head of Royal and Ducal House of Bourbon-Parma; member, Dutch Royal Family

Science, technology, engineering, mathematics

 David P. Anderson (1977) – mathematician, computer scientist (as of 2012); Space Sciences Laboratory; Presidential Young Investigator Award
 Taft Armandroff (1982) – astronomer; director, W. M. Keck Observatory, Mauna Kea (July 1, 2006–)
 Harold DeForest Arnold (Ph.B. 1906, M.S. 1907) – physicist; research led to development of transcontinental telephony
 Wilbur Olin Atwater (1865) – chemist, agricultural chemistry; known for his studies of human nutrition and metabolism
 Oliver L. Austin – ornithologist; wrote the definitive study Birds of the World Susan R. Barry (1976) – neurobiologist, specializing in neuronal plasticity (as of 2012)
 Albert Francis Blakeslee (1896) – botanist; leading figure in the genetics; known for research on jimsonweed and fungi
 Everitt P. Blizard (1938) – Canadian-born American nuclear physicist, nuclear engineer; known for his work on nuclear reactor physics and shielding; 1966 Elliott Cresson Medal
 Byron Alden Brooks (1871) – inventor; author of Earth Revisited Samuel Botsford Buckley (1836) – botanist, geologist, naturalist
 Henry Smith Carhart (1869) – physicist, specializing in electricity; devised a voltaic cell, the Carhart-Clark cell, among other inventions 
 Kenneth G. Carpenter (1976, M.A. 1977) – astrophysicist (as of 2012); Project Scientist and Principal Investigator, NASA, Hubble Space Telescope Operations
 David Carroll (PhD 1993) – physicist, nanotechnologist (as of 2012); director, Center for Nanotechnology and Molecular Materials, Wake Forest University
 Jennifer Tour Chayes (1979) – mathematician, mathematical physicist (as of 2012); National Academy of Sciences; Head, Microsoft Research New England
 Charles Manning Child (A.B. 1890, M.S. 1892) – zoologist; National Academy of Sciences; noted for his work on regeneration at the University of Chicago  
 John M. Coffin (1966) – virologist, geneticist, molecular microbiologist (as of 2012); National Academy of Sciences; Director, HIV Program, National Cancer Institute
 Richard Dansky – software developer of computer games and designer of role-playing games (as of 2012)
 Henrik Dohlman (1982) – pharmacologist, University of North Carolina at Chapel Hill
 Russell Doolittle (1951) – biochemist (as of 2012); co-developed the hydropathy index; National Academy of Sciences; 2006 John J. Carty Award for the Advancement of Science; 1989 Paul Ehrlich and Ludwig Darmstaedter Prize
 Clay Dreslough (1993) – software developer (as of 2012); creator, Baseball Mogul and Football Mogul computer sports games; co-founder, president, Sports Mogul
 Gordon P. Eaton (1951) – geologist (as of 2012); 12th Director, United States Geological Service; Director, Lamont–Doherty Earth Observatory, Columbia University (1990–94)
 Charles Alton Ellis – mathematician, structural engineer; chiefly responsible for the design of the Golden Gate Bridge
 John Wells Foster (1834) – geologist, paleontologist
 Daniel Z. Freedman – physicist, Massachusetts Institute of Technology (as of 2012); co-discovered supergravity; (2006) Dannie Heineman Prize for Mathematical Physics; 1993 Dirac Prize
 George Brown Goode – ichthyologist; National Academy of Sciences, American Academy of Arts and Sciences
 Lee Graham (postdoc study, research) – artificial intelligence, machine learning, evolutionary computation, artificial life; created 3D Virtual Creature Evolution, an artificial evolution simulation program
 Leslie Greengard (B.A. 1979) – physician, mathematician, computer scientist; co-inventor, fast multipole method, one of top-ten algorithms of 20th century; Leroy P. Steele Prize; Presidential Young Investigator Award; National Academy of Sciences; National Academy of Engineering
 Frederick Grover (1901) – physicist, National Bureau of Standards, precision measurements; electrical engineer
 Henry I. Harriman (B.A. 1898) – inventor, patents for many automatic looms; builder, hydroelectric dams
 Gerald Holton (1941) – physicist, Emeritus, Harvard University (as of 2012); 10th Jefferson Lecture; George Sarton Medal; Abraham Pais Prize; Andrew Gemant Award
 Orange Judd (1847) – agricultural chemist
 George Kellogg (1837) – inventor, patent expert; improved surgical instruments
 Jim Kurose – computer scientist (as of 2012); 2001 Taylor L. Booth Education Award of the Institute of Electrical and Electronics Engineers
 Oscar Lanford (B.S.) – mathematician, mathematical physicist, dynamical systems theory (as of 2012); Dobrushin-Lanford-Ruelle equations
 Albert L. Lehninger (B.A. 1939) – pioneering research in bioenergetics; National Academy of Sciences
 Silas Laurence Loomis, MD (1844) – mathematician, physiologist, inventor; astronomer, United States Coast Survey (1857); dean, Howard University
 Emilie Marcus (1982) – Executive Editor, Cell Press; editor-in-chief, the scientific journal Cell; CEO, Neuron (each as of 2012)
 Julia L. Marcus (A.M. 2003) – epidemiologist, science communicator, Harvard Medical School
 William Williams Mather (A.M. 1834) – geologist, inventor; acting president, Ohio University (1845)
 Jerry M. Melillo (B.A. 1965, M.A.T. 1968) – biogeochemist; Associate Director, Office of Science and Technology Policy (1996–2000)
 George Perkins Merrill (post-graduate study and research) – geologist; National Academy of Sciences (1922)
 Benjamin Franklin Mudge (1840) – geologist, paleontologist; discovered at least 80 new species of extinct plants and animals
 Frank W. Putnam (B.A. 1939, M.A. 1940) – biochemist; National Academy of Sciences, American Academy of Arts and Sciences
 Fremont Rider (M.A. 1937) – inventor, librarian, genealogist; named one of the 100 Most Important Leaders of Library Science and the Library Profession in the twentieth century
 William Robinson (B.A. 1865, M.A. 1868) – inventor, electrical engineer, mechanical engineer; invented first track circuit used in railway signaling, among other inventions
 Edward Bennett Rosa (1886) – physicist; specialising in measurement science; National Academy of Sciences (1913); Elliott Cresson Medal
 Richard Alfred Rossiter (1914) – astronomer, known for the Rossiter–McLaughlin effect
 H. Eugene Stanley (1962) – physicist, statistical physics (as of 2012); National Academy of Sciences; 2008 Julius Edgar Lilienfeld Prize; 2004 Boltzmann Medal
 Carl Leo Stearns (B.A. 1917) – astronomer; namesake of asteroid (2035) Stearns and crater Stearns (far side of the Moon)
 John Stephenson – invented, patented the first street car to run on rails; remembered as the creator of the tramway
 Charles Wardell Stiles (attended) – parasitologist; groundbreaking work, trichinosis, hookworm; 1921 Public Welfare Medal by National Academy of Sciences
 Lewis B. Stillwell (1882–1884) – electrical engineer; 1933 AIEE Lamme Medal, 1935 IEEE Edison Medal; IEEE's Electrical Engineering Hall of Fame
 Alfred Charles True (1873) – agriculturalist; director, Office of Agricultural Experiment Station, U. S. Department of Agriculture
 Mark Trueblood (candidate for PhD in physics) – engineer and astronomer (as of 2012); noted for early pioneering work in development of robotic telescopes; 15522 Trueblood
 George Tucker (PhD) – Puerto Rican physicist (as of 2012); former Olympic luger
 Nicholas Turro (1960) – chemist, Columbia University (as of 2012); National Academy of Sciences, American Academy of Arts and Sciences; 2011 Arthur C. Cope Award; Willard Gibbs Award
 John Monroe Van Vleck (1850) – astronomer, mathematician; namesake of Van Vleck crater on the Moon
 Jesse Vincent (1998) – software developer (as of 2012); developed Request Tracker while a student at Wesleyan; author, Request Tracker for Incident Response Christopher Weaver (dual MAs and CAS) – software developer; founder, Bethesda Softworks; spearheaded creation, John Madden Football physics engine; visiting scholar, Massachusetts Institute of Technology
 Henry Seely White (1882) – mathematician; National Academy of Sciences; geometry of curves and surfaces, algebraic twisted curves

Activists

 Cliff Arnebeck – chair, Legal Affairs Committee, Common Cause Ohio; national co-chair and attorney, Alliance for Democracy
 Mansoor Alam – humanitarian
 John Emory Andrus (1862) – founder, SURDNA Foundation (1917)
 Gerald L. Baliles (1987) – director, Miller Center of Public Affairs (since 2005)
 Jeannie Baliles (M.A.T.) – founder and chair, Virginia Literacy Foundation (since 1987); First Lady of Virginia (1986–90)
 John Perry Barlow (1969) – co-founder, Electronic Frontier Foundation; Fellow, Harvard University's Berkman Center for Internet and Society (since 1998)
 Andrew Bridge (1984) – advocate for foster children; New York Times best-selling author; Fulbright Scholar
 Ted Brown (attended) – libertarian politician, speaker
 Eric Byler (1994) – political activist; co-founder, Coffee Party USA
 Sasha Chanoff (1994) – founder, Executive Director, RefugePoint (2005–)
 Jaclyn Friedman (1993) – feminist writer and activist
 Jon Grepstad – Norwegian peace activist, photographer and journalist
 Amir Alexander Hasson (1998) – social entrepreneur; 2010 Massachusetts Institute of Technology's Technology Review's TR35 award; founder, United Villages
 David Jay – asexual activist and founder of the Asexual Visibility and Education Network
 Marc Kasky – consumer activist; co-director, Green Center Institute
 Matt Kelley (2002) – founder, Mavin Foundation
 Harry W. Laidler (1907) – socialist, writer and politician
 Melody Moezzi (2001) – founder, Hooping for Peace, a human-rights organization
 Sandy Newman (1974) – non-profit executive, founder of three successful non-profit organizations
 Robert Carter Pitman (1845) – temperance advocate
 Jessica Posner – 2010 Do Something Award; co-founded Shining Hope to combat gender inequality and poverty in Kibera, Nairobi Area, Kenya
 Charles Bennett Ray – first black student, Wesleyan in 1832; abolitionist; promoter, the Underground Railroad
 Richard S. Rust (1841) – abolitionist; co-founder, Freedman's Aid Society
 Juliet Schor – 2005 Leontief Prize (Wassily Leontief) by the Global Development and Environment Institute
 Ted Smith (1967) – environmental activist; founder and former executive director, Silicon Valley Toxics Coalition
 Chuck Stone – associated with the civil-rights and Black Power movements; first president, National Association of Black Journalists
 Vin Suprynowicz (1972) – libertarian activist, 2000 U.S. vice presidential candidate, Libertarian Party in Arizona
Conrad Tillard (born 1964) - politician, Baptist minister, radio host, author, and civil rights activist
 Arthur T. Vanderbilt – proponent of U.S. court modernization and reform
 Evan Weber – Co-founder, Sunrise Movement 

Sports

 Tobin Anderson (1995) - head coach of the Fairleigh Dickinson Knights men's basketball team; coached Fairleigh Dickinson when they became the first No. 16 seed out of the First Four to defeat a No. 1 seed in the NCAA Division I men's basketball tournament
 Everett Bacon (1913) – football quarterback, pioneer of the forward pass, College Football Hall of Fame
 Bill Belichick (1975) – head coach of the New England Patriots; 2004 Time's "100 Most Influential People in the World"; Nine-time Super Bowl participant as head coach, won in 2001, 2003, 2004, 2014, 2016, and 2018 (lost in Super Bowl XLII (2007), Super Bowl XLVI (2011), and Super Bowl LII (2017)); first NFL coach to win three Super Bowls in four years; NFL Coach of the Year three times (2003, 2007, 2010)
 Ambrose Burfoot (1968) – first collegian to win the Boston Marathon; won Manchester Road Race nine times; executive editor, Runner's World Magazine 
 Mike Carlson (1972) – National Football League and NFL Europe pundit (for Channel 4 in the United Kingdom)
 Eudice Chong (2016) - professional tennis player, reached #366 in the WTA singles rankings and #153 in the WTA singles rankings
 Logan Cunningham (1907–09) – football player and coach
 Wink Davenport (1964) – former volleyball Olympic player, coach, and official; father, tennis champion Lindsay Davenport
 Richard E. Eustis (1914) – football player and coach
 Jeff Galloway (1967) – former American Olympian, runner and author of Galloway's Book on Running''
 Frank Hauser (1979) – football coach
 Jed Hoyer (1996) – executive vice president and general manager, Chicago Cubs; former general manager (2009–11), San Diego Padres; former assistant general manager (2003–09), interim co-manager (2005–06), Boston Red Sox 
 Kathy Keeler (1978) – Olympic gold medalist, rowing (member of the women's eight) in the 1984 Olympics; Olympics coach in 1996
 Dan Kenan (1915) – football player and coach
 Red Lanning – Major League Baseball pitcher and outfielder; played for Philadelphia Athletics
 Amos Magee (1993) – professional soccer player, coach; former head coach, Minnesota Thunder, and is Thunder's all-time scoring leader, United Soccer Leagues Hall of Fame
 Jeffrey Maier (2006) – college baseball player; notable for an instance of spectator interference at age 12; Wesleyan's all-time leader in hits
 Eric Mangini (1994) – former head coach, Cleveland Browns, New York Jets; NFL analyst
 Vince Pazzetti (1908–10) – elected to the College Football Hall of Fame
 Bill Rodgers (1970) – winner, four New York City Marathons, four Boston Marathons, one Fukuoka Marathon; only runner to hold championship of all three major marathons at same time
 Henri Salaun (1949) – squash player; four-time winner, U.S. Squash National Championships (1955, 1957, 1958 and 1961); won, inaugural U.S. Open (1954)
 Harry Van Surdam (1905) – elected to the College Football Hall of Fame
 Mike Whalen (1983) – athlete and coach
 James Wendell (1913) – Olympic silver medalist, 110-meter hurdles, 1912 Summer Olympics in Stockholm; one of teammates, General George S. Patton
 Jeff Wilner (1994) – National Football League player
 Bert Wilson (1897) – football player and coach
 Field Yates (2009) - sportswriter and analyst for ESPN

Fictional characters

Notes

Wesleyan University people